= List of Vanderbilt University people =

This is a list of notable current and former faculty members, alumni (graduating and non-graduating) of Vanderbilt University in Nashville, Tennessee.

Unless otherwise noted, attendees listed graduated with a bachelor's degree. Names with an asterisk (*) graduated from Peabody College prior to its merger with Vanderbilt.

== Notable alumni ==
=== Academia ===
==== Presidents and chancellors ====
- Bob Agee (Ph.D.) – 13th president of Oklahoma Baptist University
- Will W. Alexander (B.Th. 1912) – founding president of Dillard University
- Niels-Erik Andreasen (Ph.D. 1971) – 5th president of Andrews University
- Roslyn Clark Artis (Ed.D. 2010) – 14th president of Benedict College
- Robert G. Bottoms (Ph.D. 1972) – 18th president of DePauw University
- William Leroy Broun – 4th president of Auburn University
- Robert Bruininks (M.A. 1965, Ph.D. 1968) – 15th president of the University of Minnesota
- Doak S. Campbell* (M.A. 1928, Ph.D. 1930) – 1st president of Florida State University
- Agenia Walker Clark (Ed.D) – 18th president of Fisk University
- Shirley Collado (B.A. 1994) – 9th president of Ithaca College
- James C. Conwell (Ph.D. 1989) – 15th president of Rose–Hulman Institute of Technology
- Dennis Hargrove Cooke* (Ph.D. 1930) – 4th president of East Carolina University
- Donald Cowan (Ph.D. 1951) – 3rd president of the University of Dallas
- Jesse Lee Cuninggim – 1st president of Scarritt College
- Merrimon Cuninggim (B.A. 1931) – 15th president of Salem College
- Herman Lee Donovan* (Ph.D. 1928) – 4th president of the University of Kentucky
- Maurice Edington (Ph.D. 1997) – 10th president of the University of the District of Columbia
- Ellen Granberg (Ph.D 2001) – 19th president of George Washington University
- Sheldon Hackney (B.A. 1955) – 6th president of the University of Pennsylvania; chairman, National Endowment for the Humanities
- Thomas K. Hearn (Ph.D. 1965) – 12th president of Wake Forest University
- E. Bruce Heilman (B.S. 1951, M.A. 1952) – 5th chancellor of the University of Richmond
- Alfred Hume (Ph.D. 1887) – 10th chancellor of the University of Mississippi
- Z. T. Johnson* (Ph.D. 1929) – 8th president of Asbury University
- David C. Joyce (Ed.D. 1995) – 13th president of Brevard College
- Robert L. King (J.D. 1971) – 7th chancellor of the State University of New York
- Bradford Knapp (B.A. 1892) – 8th president of Auburn University
- John Lowden Knight (M.A.) – 10th president of Nebraska Wesleyan University, 4th president of Baldwin-Wallace College
- Michael K. Le Roy (Ph.D. 1994) – 10th president of Calvin University
- J. Bernard Machen (B.A. 1966) – 16th president of University of Utah, 11th president of University of Florida
- The Rev. Edward Malloy (Ph.D. 1975) – 16th president of the University of Notre Dame
- Howard Justus McGinnis* (Ph.D. 1927) – 3rd president of East Carolina University
- Candice McQueen (M.Ed 1998) – 18th president of Lipscomb University
- Edward C. Merrill Jr. (Ph.D. 1954)* – 4th president of Gallaudet University
- Scott D. Miller (Ed.D. 1988) – 4th president of Virginia Wesleyan University
- Charles N. Millican* (M.A. 1946) – founding president of the University of Central Florida
- Fred Tom Mitchell* (M.A. 1927) – 10th president of Mississippi State University
- Niel Nielson (M.A., Ph.D.) – 5th president of Covenant College
- Maryly Van Leer Peck (B.E. 1951) – 2nd president of Polk State College
- J. Matthew Pinson (Ed.D.) – 5th president of Welch College
- Griffith Thompson Pugh Sr. (Ph.D. 1905) – former president of Columbia College
- Edwin Richardson (B.S. 1900)* – 9th president of Louisiana Tech University
- Kevin M. Ross (Ph.D. 2006) – 5th president of Lynn University
- Lee Royce (B.A, 1973, M.B.A, 1976, Ed.D., 1993) – 19th president of Mississippi College
- Rubel Shelly (M.A., Ph.D.) – 8th president of Rochester College (now Rochester Christian University)
- Heather A. Smith – 8th president of College of Saint Mary
- Henry N. Snyder (B.A. 1887) – 4th president of Wofford College
- Osama Tayyib (Ph.D. 1981) – 8th president of King Abdulaziz University
- John J. Tigert (B.A. 1904) – Rhodes Scholar, 3rd president of University of Florida, 7th U.S. Commissioner of Education
- William Troutt (Ph.D. 1978) – 19th president of Rhodes College
- Richard L. Wallace (Ph.D. 1965) – 20th president of the University of Missouri
- Toshimasa Yasukata (Ph.D. 1985) – president of Hokkai Gakuen University
- M. Norvel Young (M.A., Ph.D. 1937) – 3rd president of Pepperdine University
- James Fulton Zimmerman (B.A., M.A.) – 7th president of the University of New Mexico

==== Professors and scholars ====
- Ali Abdullah Al-Daffa (Ph.D. 1972) – Saudi mathematician; scholar at King Fahd University, King Saud University, Harvard University; founding fellow, Islamic Academy of Sciences
- Erik K. Alexander – professor of medicine, Harvard Medical School; co-chairman, International Guidelines on Thyroid Disease & Pregnancy
- Robert Arrington (B.A. 1960) – philosopher, Woodrow Wilson Fellow, Oxford Fellow
- John Arthur (Ph.D. 1973) – philosopher, professor at Binghamton University, Harvard University, fellow at the University of Oxford
- Marial Awou (M.A. 1992) – South Sudanese economist and academician; vice chancellor, Upper Nile University; dean, School of Social and Economic Studies, University of Juba
- Martha Bailey (Ph.D. 2005) – professor of economics at UCLA, executive board of the American Economic Association
- Jeff Balser (M.D./Ph.D. 1990) – president and CEO of Vanderbilt University Medical Center and dean of the Vanderbilt University School of Medicine
- Faisal Basri (M.A. 1988) – Indonesian economist specializing in political economics
- Barbara Belford (B.A. 1957) – professor emeritus at the Columbia University Graduate School of Journalism
- Randolph Blake (Ph.D. 1972) – Centennial Professor of Psychology at Vanderbilt, former faculty at Northwestern University and Seoul National University, National Academy of Sciences
- Dan Blazer (B.A. 1965) – J.P. Gibbons Professor of Psychiatry emeritus at Duke University School of Medicine
- Cleanth Brooks (B.A. 1928) – literary critic and professor of English at Yale University
- L. Carl Brown (B.A. 1950) – emeritus professor of history at Princeton University, Guggenheim Fellow
- Markus Brunnermeier (M.A. 1994) – economist, Edwards S. Sanford professorship at Princeton University, Guggenheim Fellow
- Anthea Butler (M.A., Ph.D. 2001) – Geraldine R. Segal Professor in American Social Thought at the University of Pennsylvania
- Sheryll Cashin (B.E. 1984) – law scholar, political adviser, professor at Georgetown University Law Center
- Kathleen R. Cho (M.D. 1984) – professor of pathology and internal medicine at Michigan Medicine, National Academy of Medicine
- Ellen Cohn (M.S. 1975) – associate dean and professor at University of Pittsburgh School of Health and Rehabilitation Sciences
- Ed Connor (M.S. 1982) – key figure in the neuroscience of object synthesis in higher-level visual cortex, professor of neuroscience at Johns Hopkins University
- Herman Daly (Ph.D.) – ecological and Georgist economist, developed the Index of Sustainable Economic Welfare, Right Livelihood Award winner
- John Emmeus Davis (B.A. 1971) – scholar who has advanced the understanding of community land trusts, taught at Tufts University and the Massachusetts Institute of Technology
- Tania Douglas (M.S. 1995) – professor of biomedical engineering, Research Chair of Biomedical Engineering and Innovation at the University of Cape Town, Quartz Africa Innovators (2018)
- Larry Druffel (Ph.D. 1975) – director emeritus and visiting scientist at the Software Engineering Institute (SEI) at Carnegie Mellon University, Fellow of the IEEE
- William Yandell Elliott (B.A. 1917, M.A. 1920) – Rhodes Scholar, professor of history at University of California, Berkeley and Harvard University
- Sarah K. England (postdoc) – Alan A. and Edith L. Wolff Professor of Obstetrics and Gynaecology at Washington University School of Medicine, Robert Wood Johnson Foundation fellow
- George T. Flom (M.A. 1894) – professor of linguistics and author of numerous reference books, knighted by 1 Class of the Royal Norwegian Order of St. Olav (1939)
- T. Kenneth Fowler (B.A. 1953, M.A. 1955) – physicist in plasma physics and magnetic nuclear fusion; former chair of nuclear engineering, University of California, Berkeley
- Kenneth Galloway (B.A. 1962) – engineer, distinguished professor of engineering, dean of the school of engineering, emeritus, Vanderbilt University
- John Gaventa, OBE (B.A. 1971) – sociologist, Rhodes Scholar, MacArthur Fellow (1981), Officer of the Order of the British Empire
- Cullen B. Gosnell (M.A. 1920), founder and former chair of the department of political science at Emory University
- Antonio Gotto (B.A. 1957, M.D. 1965) – dean of Weill Cornell Medicine, Rhodes Scholar
- Edward C. Green – medical anthropologist, Presidential Advisory Council on HIV/AIDS, senior research scientist at the Harvard T.H. Chan School of Public Health
- Roger Groot (B.A. 1963) – Class of 1975 Alumni Professor of Law at Washington and Lee University School of Law, expert in criminal law and the death penalty
- F. Peter Guengerich (Ph.D. 1973) – Tadashi Inagami Chair in Biochemistry at the Vanderbilt University School of Medicine
- Herbert Gursky (M.S. 1953) – superintendent, NRL's Space Science Div., chief scientist, Hulburt Center for Space Research, professor of physics and astronomy at Harvard, Princeton, and Columbia University
- J. Alex Haller (B.A. 1947) – first Robert Garrett Professor of Pediatric Surgery at the Johns Hopkins School of Medicine, co-creator and namesake of the Haller index
- Helen Hardacre (B.A. 1971, M.A. 1972) – Reischauer Institute Professor of Japanese Religions and Society, Harvard University; Guggenheim Fellow; Order of the Rising Sun, Japan (2018)
- Louis R. Harlan (M.S. 1948) – academic historian, winner of the 1984 Pulitzer Prize for Biography or Autobiography
- David Edwin Harrell (Ph.D. 1962) – historian at Auburn University, emeritus professor and Breeden Eminent Scholar of Southern History
- John Heil (Ph.D.) – professor of philosophy in Arts and Sciences at Washington University in St. Louis, Guggenheim Fellow (2018)
- Alfred O. Hero Jr. (M.A. 1950) – political scientist; editor, International Organization; visiting professor, University of Toronto; visiting scholar, Harvard University
- Cindy Hmelo-Silver (Ph.D. 1994) – Distinguished Professor, Barbara B. Jacobs Chair in Education and Technology, associate dean, Indiana University Bloomington
- Dorothy M. Horstmann (med. resident) – epidemiologist and virologist whose research helped set the stage for the polio vaccine, first female professor of the Yale School of Medicine
- Kung Hsiang-fu (Ph.D. 1969) – Chinese geneticist and oncologist, former director of the University of Hong Kong's Institute of Molecular Biology, Chinese Academy of Sciences
- G. Scott Hubbard (B.S. 1970) – former director of NASA's Ames Research Center, chairman, SpaceX Safety Advisory Panel, adjunct professor Stanford University
- Paul Hudak (B.S. 1973) – professor and chair of computer science department, Yale University, best known for involvement in the design of the programming language Haskell
- Richard Hurd (Ph.D.) – professor of industrial and labor relations; ILR associate dean for external relations, Cornell University School of Industrial and Labor Relations
- Muinul Islam (Ph.D. 1981) – Bangladeshi economist and academician, awarded Ekushey Padak by the Government of Bangladesh in 2018
- George Pullen Jackson (B.A. 1902) – professor of German at Vanderbilt University
- Alexander D. Johnson (B.A. 1974) – professor and vice chair of the department of microbiology and immunology at the University of California, San Francisco
- Joseph A. Kéchichian – Lebanese author and political scientist, Hoover fellow at Stanford University, former lecturer at the University of California in Los Angeles
- Edwin A. Keeble (B.E. 1924) – architect trained in the Beaux-Arts tradition, known for tall slender church steeples, nicknamed "Keeble's needles," taught at the University of Pennsylvania
- David Kirk (B.A. 1996) – sociologist; associate professor of sociology, University of Oxford; departmental director of research
- J. Davy Kirkpatrick (B.S. 1986) – astronomer at the Infrared Processing and Analysis Center at the California Institute of Technology whose research was named one of the Top 100 Stories of 2011 by Discover Magazine
- Thomas Kolditz (B.A. 1978) – former director, Leader Development Program at the Yale School of Management; founding director, Doerr Institute at Rice University
- Leah Krubitzer (Ph.D. 1989) – professor of psychology at University of California, Davis, and head of the Laboratory of Evolutionary Neurobiology, MacArthur Fellow (1998)
- Frances E. Lee (Ph.D. 1997) – professor of politics and public affairs, Princeton University; co-editor of Legislative Studies Quarterly
- Peter Mancina (Ph.D. 2016) – research associate at the Centre for Criminology, Law Faculty of the University of Oxford
- Tom Maniatis (Ph.D. 1971) – professor of molecular and cellular biology, held faculty positions at Harvard University, the California Institute of Technology, and Columbia University, Lasker Award winner (2001)
- Henry Manne (B.A. 1950) – writer and academic, considered a founder of the law and economics discipline
- Jacques Marcovitch (M.M. 1972) – Brazilian emeritus professor at the Business Administration, Economy and Accountancy Faculty, University of São Paulo
- Ray Madding McConnell (S.T.R. 1901) – early 20th-century instructor of social ethics at Harvard University
- Donald B. McCormick (B.S. 1953, Ph.D. 1958) – biochemist; professor, Cornell University; chair of biochemistry, Emory University; Guggenheim Fellow
- Glenn McGee (M.A. 1991, Ph.D. 1994) – bioethicist; founding editor of the American Journal of Bioethics; associate director of UPenn Bioethics, 1995–2005
- Timothy J. McGrew (M.A. 1991, Ph.D. 1992) – professor of philosophy, and chair of the department of philosophy at Western Michigan University
- Neil R. McMillen (Ph.D. 1969) – professor emeritus at the University of Southern Mississippi, Bancroft Prize winner (1990), Pulitzer Prize finalist (1990)
- H. Houston Merritt (B.S. 1922) – former Harvard University faculty, former dean of the Columbia University College of Physicians and Surgeons
- Edwin Mims (B.A. 1892, M.A. 1893) – chair of the Vanderbilt University English Department (1912–1942), taught many members of the Fugitives and Southern Agrarians
- Peter R. Moody Jr. (B.A. 1965) – political scientist, sinologist, professor emeritus of political science at the University of Notre Dame
- Chase C. Mooney (B.A. 1935, Ph.D. 1939) – US historian, associate editor of The Journal of American History, Guggenheim Fellow
- Merrill Moore (B.A. 1924) – Ericksonian psychologist, poet, taught neurology at Harvard Medical School, research fellow of the Harvard Psychological Clinic
- David Morton (B.A. 1909) – poet, Golden Rose Award winner, faculty at Amherst College
- Pieter Mosterman (Ph.D. 1997) – chief research scientist, director of the MathWorks Advanced Research & Technology Office (MARTO), adjunct professor at McGill University
- Erik Musiek (Ph.D. 2005) – Charlotte & Paul Hagemann Professor of Neurology at Washington University in St. Louis
- Michael Ndurumo (B.S., M.S., Ph.D.) – Kenyan Professor of Psychology at the University of Nairobi, Kenya, activist for special education in Africa
- Mark Noll (Ph.D. 1975) – historian, research professor of history at Regent College, previously Francis A. McAnaney Professor of History at the University of Notre Dame
- Michael O'Brien – British historian, professor of American Intellectual History at the University of Cambridge
- Efosa Ojomo (B.E. 2005) – Global Prosperity lead, Clayton Christensen Institute, senior research fellow, Harvard Business School
- Marcia O'Malley (MS 1999, PhD 2001) – Thomas Michael Panos Family Professor in Mechanical Engineering, associate dean, School of Engineering, Rice University
- Kit Parker (Ph.D. 1998) – Tarr Family Professor of Bioengineering and Applied Physics at Harvard University, research includes tissue engineering, traumatic brain injury, micro- and nanotechnologies
- Monica E. Peek (B.S. 1991) – Ellen H. Block Professor for Health Justice at the Pritzker School of Medicine, University of Chicago
- Madison Powers (B.A. 1972, M.A. 1982) – Francis J. McNamara Jr Professor Emeritus of Philosophy at Georgetown University
- Don K. Price (B.A. 1931) – founding dean of Harvard Kennedy School (1958–1976), Rhodes Scholar
- Bill Purcell (J.D. 1979) – former director of the Institute of Politics (IOP) at Harvard Kennedy School
- M. Azizur Rahman (Ph.D 1988) – former vice-chancellor, Uttara University, economic advisor, U.S. Agency for International Development
- Stuart C. Ray (M.D. 1990) – vice chair of medicine for data integrity and analytics, associate director of the Infectious Diseases Fellowship Training Program at the Johns Hopkins School of Medicine
- J. Fred Rippy (M.A. 1915) – historian of Latin American and American diplomacy, professor of history at the University of Chicago and Duke University, Guggenheim Fellow
- Marylyn D. Ritchie (M.S. 2002, Ph.D. 2004) – professor of genetics; director, Center for Translational Bioinformatics at the University of Pennsylvania
- Irene Roberts (postdoc) – emeritus professor of paediatric haematology at the Weatherall Institute of Molecular Medicine, University of Oxford
- Tom Rockmore (Ph.D. 1974) – distinguished humanities chair, professor at Peking University, China
- Tania Roy (M.S. 2008, Ph.D. 2011) – professor of electrical and computer engineering, Duke University
- Leland Sage (B.A. 1922) – American historian, professor emeritus of history at the University of Northern Iowa
- Elyn Saks (B.A. 1977) – associate dean and professor of law at the University of Southern California; scholar of mental health law; MacArthur Fellow (2009)
- Roberto Castillo Sandoval (M.A. 1985) – Chilean author and professor of comparative literature and Latin American studies at Haverford College
- Edward Schumacher-Matos (B.A. 1968) – director, Edward R. Murrow Center, Tufts University, former faculty, Columbia University School of Journalism, former director, migration studies, Harvard University
- James K. Sebenius (B.A. 1975) – economist, Gordon Donaldson Professor of Business administration at Harvard Business School
- Artyom Shneyerov (M.A. 1997) – microeconomist at Concordia University in Montreal, Quebec, Canada
- Debora Shuger (B.A. 1975, M.A. 1978, M.A.T. 1978) – distinguished professor of English at University of California, Los Angeles, contributor to the Cambridge History of Early Modern English Literature, Guggenheim Fellow
- Lee Sigelman (Ph.D. 1973) – political scientist, former editor-in-chief of the American Political Science Review
- Evgenia Smirni (Ph.D. 1995) – Sidney P. Chockley Professor of Computer Science at the College of William & Mary, IEEE Fellow
- D.M. Smith (B.A. 1908, M.A. 1910) – mathematician and professor at Georgia Tech, charter member of the American Mathematical Society
- James Perrin Smith (M.A. 1887) – early scholar of Mesozoic rock formations, professor of geology and paleontology at Stanford University, Mary Clark Thompson Medal winner, National Academy of Sciences
- Erica Spatz (B.S. 1997) – associate professor, clinical investigator at the Center for Outcomes Research and Evaluation, Yale University School of Medicine
- Mildred T. Stahlman (B.A. 1943, M.D. 1946) – professor of pediatrics and pathology at Vanderbilt, started the first newborn intensive care unit in the world, John Howland Award winner
- David Stuart (Ph.D. 1995) – archaeologist/epigrapher, MacArthur Fellow at age 18, former curator of Maya Hieroglyphs and senior lecturer at Harvard University, Schele Professor of Mesoamerican Art and Writing at University of Texas at Austin
- John J. Stuhr (M.A., Ph.D. 1976) – distinguished professor of philosophy and American studies at Emory University, coined "genealogical pragmatism"
- Mriganka Sur (M.S. 1975, Ph.D. 1978) – Newton Professor of Neuroscience, Simons Center for the Social Brain Director, investigator at the Picower Institute for Learning and Memory at MIT
- James R. Thompson (B.S. 1960) – former chair of the department of statistics and Noah Harding Emeritus Professor of Statistics at Rice University
- Antonio D. Tillis (B.S. 1987) – dean, College of Charleston; chair, Latin American studies, Purdue University; chair, African and African-American studies, Dartmouth College
- Richard D. Todd (B.S.) – former Blanche F. Ittleson Professor of Psychiatry; director, child and adolescent psychiatry at Washington University in St. Louis
- Victor J. Torres (Ph.D. 2004) – C.V. Starr Professor of Microbiology, New York University Grossman School of Medicine; director, Anti-Microbial Resistant Pathogens Program; MacArthur Fellow (2021)
- Thomas J. Trebat (Ph.D.) – economist and political scientist who teaches at the School of International and Public Affairs at Columbia University, member of the Council on Foreign Relations
- James C. Tsai (M.B.A. 1998) – former Robert R. Young Professor of Ophthalmology and Visual Science and chair, Department of Ophthalmology, Yale University School of Medicine
- David Tzuriel (Ph.D. 1977) – Israeli psychologist, professor and chairman of the school of education at Bar-Ilan University
- Venkat Venkatasubramanian (M.S. 1979) – Samuel Ruben-Peter G. Viele Professor of Engineering, Columbia University; founder, Complex Resilient Intelligent Systems Laboratory (CRIS Lab)
- Mark T. Wallace (Ph.D. 1990) – Louise B. McGavock Chair of Neuroscience, professor of psychology, Vanderbilt University
- Richard M. Weaver (M.A. 1934) – Platonist philosopher, author, scholar, and authority on modern rhetoric, professor of English at the University of Chicago
- Thomas Williams (B.A. 1988) – Isabelle A. and Henry D. Martin Professor of Medieval Philosophy at Georgetown University
- Emil Carl Wilm (M.A. 1903) – Prussian-American philosopher, professor at Washburn College, Harvard University, Boston University, and Stanford University
- John Long Wilson (B.A. 1935) – medical professor and administrator at American University of Beirut, Lebanon, and Stanford University
- Sheldon M. Wolff (M.D. 1957) – former chair of the department of medicine at Tufts University School of Medicine
- Minky Worden (B.A. 1989) – human rights advocate and author, director of Global Initiatives at Human Rights Watch, professor at Columbia University's School of International and Public Affairs
- Thomas Daniel Young (Ph.D. 1950) – first Gertrude C. Vanderbilt Professor of English at Vanderbilt University

=== Art, literature, and humanities ===
- Alev Alatlı (M.A. 1965) – Turkish economist, philosopher, columnist and bestselling novelist
- Thomas B. Allen – expressionist painter and illustrator, pioneer of visual journalism
- Brian Andrews (B.A. 1996) – author, Andrews and Wilson; Act of Defiance (2024)
- John F. Andrews, OBE (Ph.D. 1971) – writer, Shakespeare scholar
- Alfred Bartles – composer of "Music for Symphony Orchestra and Jazz Ensemble"
- Richmond C. Beatty (M.A. 1928, Ph.D. 1930) – biographer and critic, Guggenheim Fellow
- Lynne Berry (Ph.D. 1997) – writer and poet
- Diann Blakely (M.A. 1980) – poet
- Campbell Bonner (B.A. 1896, M.A. 1897) – classicist
- Jack Boone (B.A., M.A., Ph.D.) – writer, O. Henry Award Winner (1932)
- William Brittelle (B.M. 1999) – electro-acoustic composer
- Cleanth Brooks (B.A. 1928) – founder of New Criticism, The Well Wrought Urn (1947)
- Rita Bullwinkel (MFA 2016) – author, 2024 Booker Prize
- Thomas G. Burton (M.A. 1958, Ph.D. 1966) – author
- Anders Carlson-Wee (MFA) – poet, 2015 National Endowment for the Arts Fellow
- Marshall Chapman (B.A. 1971) – singer-songwriter, author
- Brainard Cheney – novelist, playwright and essayist, member of the Southern Agrarians
- Mel Chin (B.A. 1975) – conceptual visual artist, MacArthur Fellow (2019)
- Charles Edward Choate – architect
- Tiana Clark (M.F.A. 2017) – poet
- Clyde Connell – abstract expressionist sculptor
- Alfred Leland Crabb (B.A. Peabody) – author of historical fiction
- Bruce Crabtree – architect
- Francis Craig – songwriter, including Vanderbilt fight song "Dynamite" (1922)
- Compton Newby Crook* (B.A. 1929) – science fiction writer, Hugo Award winner, namesake of the Compton Crook Award
- David Dark (Ph.D. 2011) – writer
- Donald Davidson (B.A. 1917, M.A. 1922) – novelist, poet, and opera librettist
- James Dickey (B.A. 1949) – author and poet, winner of the National Book Award for Poetry, author of the novel Deliverance
- Julia Lester Dillon* (B.A. 1890) – landscape architect, inscribed upon the Georgia Women of Achievement in 2003
- Marjorie K. Eastman (M.B.A.) – author of The Frontline Generation, 2017 Independent Publishers National Book Award winner
- Ruth Denson Edwards* (B.A. 1913) – hymnwriter and figure in the Sacred Harp movement
- William Eggleston – photographer
- Francis Perry Elliott – novelist known for screen adaptions The Square Deceiver (1917) and Pals First (1926)
- Karen Essex (M.F.A 1999) – historical novelist known for Leonardo's Swans and Stealing Athena
- Maria Beale Fletcher – Radio City Music Hall Rockette; Miss America of 1962
- Jesse Hill Ford (B.A. 1951) – writer of Southern Literature
- Frances Fowler – painter
- Ellen Gilchrist – National Book Award-winning author
- Red Grooms – multimedia artist most associated with pop art
- Kelsie B. Harder (B.A. 1950, M.A. 1951) – onomastician
- Costen Jordan Harrell (M.A. 1910) – writer and bishop of The Methodist Church
- William Harrison (M.A. 1959) – novelist, short story writer, and screenwriter, Burton and Speke, Rollerball, Guggenheim Fellow (1973)
- Eric L. Harry (BA 1980, MBA 1983, JD 1984) – author best known for his novels Arc Light and Invasion
- Ross Hassig (M.A. 1974) – anthropologist, author, Mesoamerica scholar
- Sylvia Hyman* (M.A. 1963) – sculptor and ceramic artist
- William Inge (Peabody, 1935) – Pulitzer Prize-winning playwright, best known for Picnic
- Michelle Izmaylov (M.D.) – bestselling writer of fantasy-fiction books
- George Pullen Jackson (B.A. 1902) – musicologist, pioneer in the field of Southern American hymnody
- Randall Jarrell (M.A. 1938) – United States Poet Laureate
- Claire Jiménez (MFA 2014) – Puerto Rican author and essayist
- Madison Jones (B.A. 1949) – novelist, member of the Southern Agrarians
- Donika Kelly (M.A. 2009) – poet, winner of the 2015 Cave Canem prize
- Mark Kendall (B.A. 2005, M.A. 2008) – artist and filmmaker, La Camioneta (2012), Guggenheim Fellow
- Matthew Washington Kennedy* (Ph.D.) – classical pianist and composer
- Mark Thomas Ketterson (B.A. 1976) – performing arts journalist and critic, Opera News
- Edgar Kunz (M.F.A. 2015) – poet, National Endowment for the Arts Fellow (2017), Guggenheim Fellow (2026)
- Perry Lentz (M.A. 1966, Ph.D. 1970) – author, Woodrow Wilson Fellow and Rockefeller Foundation grant holder
- Alan LeQuire (B.A. 1978) – sculptor
- Andrew Nelson Lytle (B.A. 1925) – novelist and professor
- Evan Mack (B.M. 2003) – composer, librettist and pianist
- Ellis K. Meacham (LL.B 1937) – authored a Napoleonic era nautical adventure trilogy published by Little, Brown (US) and Hodder & Stoughton (UK)
- Creighton Michael (M.A. 1976) – abstract artist
- Greg Miller (B.A. 1979) – poet
- Jim Wayne Miller (Ph.D. 1965) – Appalachian poet
- Merrill Moore (B.A. 1924) – poet
- W. R. Moses (Ph.D.) – poet
- Philip Nel (Ph.D. 1997) – scholar of children's literature
- Adrienne Outlaw – sculptor
- Edd Winfield Parks (Ph.D. 1929) – writer and essayist
- H. Clinton Parrent Jr. – architect
- James Patterson (M.A. 1970) – bestselling contemporary writer of thrillers
- Jon Parrish Peede (B.A.) – former chairman of the National Endowment for the Humanities
- John Crowe Ransom (B.A. 1909) – poet and essayist, founder of New Criticism, Rhodes Scholar
- Fahmi Reza – Malaysian political street artist and documentarian
- Graham Robb FRSL (Ph.D. 1986) – British author, The Discovery of France, Chevalier of the Ordre des Arts et des Lettres
- Kaira Rouda (B.A. 1985) – novelist
- Daniel Bernard Roumain (B.M 1993) – composer, performer, violinist, and band-leader
- Robert Ryman* – painter associated with monochrome painting, minimalism, and conceptual art
- David P. Sartor – composer and conductor
- Steven D. Schroeder (B.A.) – poet
- Tom Schulman (B.A. 1972) – Academy Award-winning screenwriter of the film Dead Poets Society
- Jeanne Ellison Shaffer (Ph.D. 1970) – composer
- Beasley Smith – composer and big band musician
- Samuel L. Smith* (M.A. 1918) – practical architect
- Elizabeth Spencer (M.A. 1943) – writer of the novella The Light in the Piazza
- Laura Spong (B.A. 1948) – Abstract expressionist painter
- James Still (M.A. 1930) – poet, novelist and folklorist, best known for the novel River of Earth (1940)
- Georgia Stitt (B.M 1994) – composer and lyricist, arranger, conductor, and musical director
- H.R. Stoneback (Ph.D. 1970) – academic, poet, and folk singer, Hemingway, Durrell, and Faulkner scholar
- Jesse Stuart – writer, Guggenheim Fellow
- Amy H. Sturgis (Ph.D.) – author, speaker and scholar of science fiction/fantasy studies and Native American studies
- Walter Sullivan (B.A. 1947) – southern novelist and literary critic, founding charter member of the Fellowship of Southern Writers
- Patricia Taft (B.S. 2007) – interior designer, great-granddaughter of U.S. President William Howard Taft
- Allen Tate (B.A. 1922) – United States Poet Laureate
- Eleanor Ross Taylor – poet, 2010 Ruth Lilly Poetry Prize
- Peter Taylor – novelist, short story writer, and playwright, 1987 Pulitzer Prize for Fiction
- Nafissa Thompson-Spires (M.A. 2005, Ph.D. 2009) – writer, 2019 Whiting Award
- Pat Toomay – NFL defensive end, author of Any Given Sunday, basis for Oliver Stone's film of the same name (1999)
- William Trowbridge (Ph.D. 1975) – poet, Academy of American Poets Prize
- Robert Turner (M.A. 1950) – Canadian composer, appointed Order of Canada in 2002
- Robert Penn Warren (B.A. 1925) – Pulitzer Prize winner, United States Poet Laureate, author of All the King's Men (1946)
- Geoffrey R. Waters (B.A.) – poet and translator, Willis Barnstone Translation Prize
- Sarah Webb – Contemporary realist painter
- James Whitehead (B.A., M.A.) – poet, 1972 Guggenheim Fellow
- Ralph Wickiser* (M.A. 1935, Ph.D. 1938) – painter
- Greg Williamson – poet, known for the invention of the "Double Exposure" form in which one poem can be read three different ways
- Martin Wilson (B.A. 1995) – writer best known for his award-winning debut novel What They Always Tell Us
- Terri Witek (B.S. 1983, M.A. 1984, Ph.D. 1988) – poet, Slope Editions Prize, Center for Book Arts Prize Winner
- John Yount (B.A. 1960) – novelist, 1974 Guggenheim Fellow
- Kat Zhang (B.A. 2013) – science-fiction novelist, What's Left of Me (2012)

=== Athletics ===
==== Baseball ====
- Pedro Alvarez – infielder, Pittsburgh Pirates (2010–15), Baltimore Orioles (2016–18)
- Mike Baxter – outfielder, San Diego Padres (2010), New York Mets (2011–13), Los Angeles Dodgers (2014), Chicago Cubs (2015)
- Tyler Beede – pitcher, San Francisco Giants (2018–present)
- Walker Buehler – pitcher, Los Angeles Dodgers (2017–2024); All-Star (2019), Boston Red Sox (present)
- Vin Campbell – outfielder, Chicago Cubs (1908), Pittsburgh Pirates (1910–11), Boston Braves (1912), Indianapolis Hoosiers (1914), and Newark Peppers (1915)
- Curt Casali – catcher, Tampa Bay Rays (2014–17), Cincinnati Reds (2018), San Francisco Giants (present)
- Wilson Collins – outfielder, Boston Braves (1913–1914)
- Doc Cook – outfielder, New York Yankees (1913–1916)
- Joey Cora – second baseman, Cleveland Indians (1998); Seattle Mariners (1995–98/ All-Star 1997); Chicago White Sox (1991–94); San Diego Padres (1987, 1989–90)
- Caleb Cotham – pitcher, New York Yankees (2015), Cincinnati Reds (2016)
- Slim Embry – starting pitcher, Chicago White Sox (1923)
- Ryan Flaherty – infielder, Baltimore Orioles (2012–17), Atlanta Braves (2018), Cleveland Indians (2019); coach, San Diego Padres (2020–present)
- Carson Fulmer – pitcher, Chicago White Sox (2016–present)
- Sonny Gray – pitcher, Oakland Athletics (2013–17), New York Yankees (2017–18), Cincinnati Reds (2019–present); All-Star (2015, 2019)
- Harvey Hendrick – New York Yankees (1923–24), Cleveland Indians (1925), Brooklyn Robins (1927–31), Cincinnati Reds (1931–32), St. Louis Cardinals (1932), Chicago Cubs (1933), Philadelphia Phillies (1934)
- Matt Kata – infielder, Arizona Diamondbacks (2003–05), Philadelphia Phillies (2005), Texas Rangers, Pittsburgh Pirates (2007), Houston Astros (2009)
- Tony Kemp – second baseman, outfielder, Houston Astros (2016–19), Chicago Cubs (2019), Oakland Athletics (2020–present)
- Jack Leiter (B.A. 2023) – pitcher
- Jensen Lewis – broadcaster; pitcher, Cleveland Indians (2005–11), Arizona Diamondbacks (2012), Chicago Cubs (2013); Roberto Clemente Award nominee (2010)
- Scotti Madison – third baseman, Detroit Tigers (1985–86), Kansas City Royals (1987–88), Cincinnati Reds (1989)
- Austin Martin – shortstop, Toronto Blue Jays (2020–present)
- Mike Minor – starting pitcher, Atlanta Braves (2010–14), Kansas City Royals (2017), Texas Rangers (2018–20), Oakland Athletics (2020–present); All-Star (2019)
- Scrappy Moore – third baseman, St. Louis Browns (1917)
- Penn Murfee – pitcher, United States national baseball team, 2019 WBSC Premier12
- Josh Paul – catcher, Arizona Diamondbacks (2003–05), Philadelphia Phillies (2005), Texas Rangers (2007), Pittsburgh Pirates (2007), Houston Astros (2009)
- David Price – starting pitcher, Los Angeles Dodgers; All-Star (2010–12, 2014, 2015), Cy Young Award (2012), World Series champion (2018)
- Andy Reese – infielder/outfielder, New York Giants (1927–30)
- Bryan Reynolds – outfielder, Pittsburgh Pirates (2019–present)
- Antoan Richardson – outfielder, Atlanta Braves (2011), New York Yankees (2014); first base coach, San Francisco Giants (2020–present)
- Scott Sanderson – Montreal Expos, Chicago Cubs, Oakland Athletics, New York Yankees, California Angels, San Francisco Giants, Chicago White Sox, California Angels (1978–96); All-Star (1991)
- Sam Selman – pitcher, San Francisco Giants (2019–present)
- Rip Sewell – starting pitcher, Detroit Tigers (1932), Pittsburgh Pirates (1938–1949); 4× All-Star (1943–1946)
- Justus Sheffield – pitcher, New York Yankees (2018), Seattle Mariners (2019–present)
- Jeremy Sowers – pitcher, Cleveland Indians (2006–09); executive, Tampa Bay Rays (2020–present)
- Dansby Swanson – shortstop, Atlanta Braves (2016–present); Haarlem Baseball Week Gold (2014)
- Drew VerHagen – pitcher, Detroit Tigers (2014–19), Hokkaido Nippon-Ham Fighters (2020–present)
- Casey Weathers – pitcher, Colorado Rockies (2007–10), Chicago Cubs (2011–12); Bronze Medal, 2008 Summer Olympics
- Mike Willis – pitcher, Toronto Blue Jays (1977–81)
- Rhett Wiseman – outfielder, Washington Nationals (Minor League); Team Israel, World Baseball Classic (2017)
- Kyle Wright – pitcher, Atlanta Braves (2018–present)
- Mike Yastrzemski – outfielder, San Francisco Giants (2019–present); Willie Mac Award (2020)
- Josh Zeid – pitcher, Houston Astros (2013–14); Team Israel, World Baseball Classic (2017)

==== Basketball ====
- Chantelle Anderson – women's basketball (1999–2003); Sacramento Monarchs (2003–04), San Antonio Silver Stars (2005–07)
- Wade Baldwin IV – men's basketball (2014–16); Memphis Grizzlies (2016–17), Portland Trail Blazers (2017–19), now with Maccabi Tel Aviv of the Israeli Basketball Premier League
- Rhonda Blades – women's basketball (1991–95); New York Liberty (1997), Detroit Shock (1998)
- Derrick Byars – men's basketball (2005–07); SEC Player of the Year (2007); Chicago Bulls (2010), San Antonio Spurs (2012)
- Charles Davis – men's basketball (1976–81); Washington Bullets (1981–84), Milwaukee Bucks (1984–87), San Antonio Spurs (1987), Chicago Bulls (1988–90)
- Festus Ezeli – men's basketball (2008–12); Golden State Warriors (2012–16), Portland Trail Blazers (2016–17), NBA Champion (2015)
- Mariella Fasoula – women's basketball (2018–20); Greece national team
- Butch Feher – men's basketball (1972–76); Phoenix Suns (1976–77)
- Johnny "Red" Floyd – football and basketball (1915–16, 1919–20); namesake of Johnny "Red" Floyd Stadium
- Jeff Fosnes – men's basketball (1972–1976); 1st Academic All-American; fourth-round draft pick, Golden State Warriors (1976)
- Shan Foster – men's basketball (2005–08); second team Associated Press All-American; 2008 SEC Player of the Year
- Rod Freeman – men's basketball (1970–73); Philadelphia 76ers (1973–74)
- Matt Freije – men's basketball (2000–04); New Orleans Hornets (2004–05), Atlanta Hawks (2006)
- Ronald Green (1944–2012) – American-Israeli men's basketball player
- John Jenkins – men's basketball (2009–12); All-SEC (2011, 2012); Atlanta Hawks (2012–15), Dallas Mavericks (2015–16), Phoenix Suns (2016–17), New York Knicks (2019)
- Damian Jones – men's basketball (2013–16); Golden State Warriors (2016–19), Atlanta Hawks (2019–present); NBA Champion (2017, 2018)
- Hutch Jones – men's basketball (1979–82); San Diego Clippers (1982–83)
- Zuzana Klimešová – women's basketball (2001); Czech former basketball player, Olympian in the 2004 Summer Olympics
- Frank Kornet – men's basketball (1985–89); Milwaukee Bucks (1989–91)
- Luke Kornet – men's basketball (2013–17); New York Knicks (2017–19), Chicago Bulls (2019–2021); Boston Celtics (2021); Cleveland Cavaliers (2021–2022); Milwaukee Bucks (2022); Boston Celtics (2022–2025); San Antonio Spurs (present); NBA champion (2024)
- Dan Langhi – men's basketball (1996–2000); Houston Rockets (2000–02), Phoenix Suns (2002–03), Golden State Warriors (2003), Milwaukee Bucks (2003)
- Clyde Lee – men's basketball (1963–66); SEC Player of the Year (1966), All-American (1966); San Francisco/Golden State Warriors (1966–74), Atlanta Hawks (1975), Philadelphia 76ers (1975–76)
- Saben Lee (born 1999), basketball player for Maccabi Tel Aviv of the Israeli Basketball Premier League
- Matt Maloney – men's basketball (1990–91); Houston Rockets (1996–99), Chicago Bulls (2000), Atlanta Hawks (2000–03)
- Billy McCaffrey – men's basketball (1991–93); two-time All-American; SEC Player of the Year (1993)
- Aaron Nesmith – men's basketball (2018–20); Boston Celtics (2020–2022); Indiana Pacers (2022–present)
- Will Perdue – men's basketball (1983–88); Chicago Bulls (1988–95), San Antonio Spurs (1995–99), Portland Trail Blazers (2000–01), 4× NBA Champion (1991–1993, 1999)
- Sheri Sam – women's basketball (1992–96); WNBA Charlotte Sting (2005–06), Seattle Storm (2004), Minnesota Lynx (2003), Miami Sol (2000–02), Orlando Miracle (1999)
- Simisola Shittu (born 1999) – men's basketball; British-born Canadian basketball player for Ironi Ness Ziona of the Israeli Basketball Premier League
- Jeffery Taylor – men's basketball (2008–12); Charlotte Hornets (2012–15), Real Madrid (2015–present), EuroLeague Champion (2018)
- Carla Thomas – women's basketball (2003–07); Chicago Sky (2007)
- Jeff Turner – men's basketball (1980–84); New Jersey Nets (1984–87); gold medalist at the 1984 Summer Olympics
- Jan van Breda Kolff – men's basketball (1971–74); SEC Player of the Year (1974); Denver Nuggets (1974–75), New York / New Jersey Nets (1976–83)
- Perry Wallace – men's basketball (1967–70); first African-American basketball player in the SEC; U.S. Department of Justice attorney; professor of law, American University (1993–2017)
- Payton Willis (born 1998) – men's basketball (2016–18); plays in the Israeli Basketball Premier League

==== Football ====
- Bob Asher – offensive tackle (1967–69); Dallas Cowboys (1970–71), Chicago Bears (1972–75), Super Bowl VI Champion
- Earl Bennett – wide receiver (2005–08); 3× All-SEC (2005–06),Chicago Bears (2008–14), Cleveland Browns (2014)
- Lynn Bomar – end (1921–24); New York Giants (1925–26); College Football Hall of Fame (1956)
- Mack Brown – running back (1969–70); head coach, University of Texas (1998–2013), University of North Carolina (1988–97, 2019–)
- Watson Brown – quarterback (1969–72); head coach, Austin Peay (1979–80), Cincinnati (1983), Rice (1984–85), Vanderbilt (1986–90), UAB (1995–2006), Tennessee Tech (2007–)
- Corey Chavous – safety (1994–98); Arizona Cardinals (1998–2001), Minnesota Vikings (2002–05), St. Louis Rams (2006–08)
- Josh Cody – tackle (1914–1916, 1919); 3× All-American, College Football Hall of Fame (1970)
- David Culley – quarterback (1974–1977); head coach, Houston Texans (2021– )
- Zach Cunningham – linebacker (2014–16); First-team All-American (2016); Houston Texans (2017–)
- Bucky Curtis – defensive back (1947–1950); Cleveland Browns (1951), Toronto Argonauts (1955–56); All-American (1950)
- Jay Cutler – quarterback (2002–05); Denver Broncos (2006–09), Chicago Bears (2009–16), Miami Dolphins (2017); "100 Greatest Bears of All-Time"
- Art Demmas – linebacker (1952–56), captain (1956); NFL Official (1970–96)
- Jamie Duncan – linebacker (1995–97), All-American (1997); Tampa Bay Buccaneers (1998–2001), St. Louis Rams (2002–03), Atlanta Falcons (2004)
- Ewing Y. Freeland – tackle (1909–12); head coach, SMU (1922–23), Texas Tech (1925–28), Austin College (1936–38)
- Jonathan Goff – linebacker (2005–07); New York Giants (2008–11); Super Bowl XLVI Champion
- Clarence "Pete" Gracey – center (1930–32); All-American (1932)
- Corey Harris – safety (1988–91); Green Bay Packers (1992–94), Seattle Seahawks (1995–96), Miami Dolphins (1997), Baltimore Ravens (1998–2001), Detroit Lions (2002–03)
- Casey Hayward – cornerback (2008–11); Green Bay Packers (2012–15), Los Angeles Chargers (2016–); 2× Pro Bowl (2016, 2017); NFL interceptions leader (2016)
- Hunter Hillenmeyer – linebacker (1999–2002); Chicago Bears (2003–10); NFC Champion (2006)
- Carl Hinkle – center (1935–37), Southeastern Conference MVP (1937), College Football Hall of Fame (1959)
- Elliott Jones – fullback (1890–92); captain (1890–92)
- W. J. "Cap" Keller – quarterback (1893–94); captain (1893–1894)
- Everett "Tuck" Kelly – guard (1922–24); All-Southern (1923), captain (1924)
- Oliver "Doc" Kuhn – quarterback (1920–1923); captain (1923); Porter Cup (1923)
- Frank Kyle – quarterback (1902–05); head coach, Ole Miss (1908)
- Clark Lea – fullback (2002–04); defensive coordinator for Notre Dame (2018–20), head coach for Vanderbilt (2021–)
- David Lee – quarterback (1971–75); captain (1974); head coach, University of Texas at El Paso (1989–93), NFL quarterback coach (2003–)
- Allama Matthews – wide receiver (1979–82), Atlanta Falcons (1983–85)
- D. J. Moore – cornerback (2006–08); Chicago Bears (2009–2012), Carolina Panthers (2013), Tampa Bay Buccaneers (2014)
- Jess Neely – halfback (1920–22); captain (1922); head coach, Rice University (1940–67), Vanderbilt athletic director (1967–71, 1973)
- Dick Plasman – end and captain (1936), Chicago Bears (1937–41, 1944), Chicago Cardinals (1946–47), 3× NFL champion, last NFL player to play without a helmet
- Shelton Quarles – middle linebacker (1990–93); Tampa Bay Buccaneers (1997–2006); Super Bowl XXXVII Champion
- Tom Redmond – defensive tackle (1955–58); St. Louis Cardinals (1960–65)
- Herb Rich – safety (1946–49); Baltimore Colts (1950), Los Angeles Rams (1951–53), New York Giants (1954–56)
- Bob Rives – tackle (1923–25); All-Southern (1924–1925); Newark Bears (1926)
- Jordan Rodgers – quarterback (2010–2012); Jacksonville Jaguars (2013), Tampa Bay Buccaneers (2013), Miami Dolphins (2014); TV personality
- Bo Rowland – end (1923–24); head coach, Henderson-Brown (1925–30), The Citadel (1940–42), Oklahoma City (1946–47), George Washington (1948–51)
- Justin Skule – offensive tackle (2015–2019); San Francisco 49ers (2019–)
- Rupert Smith – halfback, quarterback (1921); SIAA Champion (1921)
- Bill Spears – quarterback (1925–27); College Football Hall of Fame (1962)
- Matt Stewart – linebacker (1997–2000); Atlanta Falcons (2001–04), Cleveland Browns (2005–07)
- Whit Taylor – quarterback (1979–1982); ArenaBowl I Champion (1987), SEC Football Legend (2003)
- Ke'Shawn Vaughn – running back (2017–19); SEC Newcomer of the Year (2018); Tampa Bay Buccaneers (2020–)
- Bradley Vierling – center (2008–09); Pittsburgh Steelers (2010), Jacksonville Jaguars (2010–11), Pittsburgh Steelers (2012)
- Bill Wade – quarterback (1949–51); Southeastern Conference MVP (1951); Los Angeles Rams (1954–60), Chicago Bears (1961–66), NFL champion (1963)
- Henry Wakefield – end (1921–1924); consensus All-American (1924), All-Southern (1923, 1924)
- E. M. "Nig" Waller – quarterback (1924–26); head coach, Middle Tennessee (1933–1934)
- Stephen Weatherly – defensive end (2013–15); Minnesota Vikings (2016–19), Carolina Panthers (2020–)
- Chris Williams – offensive tackle (2005–07); Chicago Bears (2008–12), St. Louis Rams (2012–13), Buffalo Bills (2014)
- Jimmy Williams – defensive back (1997–2000); San Francisco 49ers (2001–04), Seattle Seahawks (2005–06), Houston Texans (2008)
- Jamie Winborn – linebacker (1998–2000); 49ers (2001–05), Jaguars (2005–06), Buccaneers (2006–07), Broncos (2007–08), Titans (2009–10)
- DeMond Winston – linebacker (1986–89), captain (1989); New Orleans Saints (1990–94)
- Will Wolford – offensive lineman (1983–85); Buffalo Bills (1986–93), Indianapolis Colts (1993–96), Pittsburgh Steelers (1996–98), 3× Pro Bowl (1990, 1992, 1995)
- Todd Yoder – tight end (1996–99); Tampa Bay Buccaneers (2000–03), Jacksonville Jaguars (2004–05), Washington Redskins (2006–09), Super Bowl XXXVII Champion

==== Other athletes ====
- Marina Alex – professional golfer, Cambia Portland Classic Winner (2018)
- Lawson Aschenbach – professional racing driver; 4× Pirelli World Challenge Champion, 2014 Lamborghini Super Trofeo World Champion
- Josie Barnes – ten-pin bowler, 2021 U.S. Women's Open champion
- Maria Bulanova – Russian ten-pin bowler, youngest player ever to win a European Bowling Tour title, age 14 (2013)
- Fernanda Contreras – Mexican professional tennis player, 2017 Riviera All-American Championship
- Jon Curran – professional golfer, PGA Championship T33 (2016)
- Julie Ditty – professional tennis player, career-high WTA Tour ranking No. 89 (2008)
- Andrea Farley – professional tennis player, career-high WTA Tour ranking No. 118 (1989)
- Walter Glasgow – sailor, silver medal, fleet/match race keelboat open (Soling) mixed, 1976 Summer Olympics
- Lina Granados – Colombian professional soccer player; defender, FF Lugano 1976
- Ásthildur Helgadóttir – Icelandic soccer player, Iceland women's national football team (1993–2007), Breiðablik, KR, Malmö FF Dam
- Jennifer Hooker – swimmer; gold, 1978 World Aquatics Championships; US Team, 1976 Montreal Summer Olympics
- Beatričė Juškevičiūtė – Lithuanian heptathlete, 2025 European Athletics Indoor Championships
- Tony Kuhn – soccer player; forward, Major League Soccer
- Peter Lamb – South African professional tennis player, 1978 Davis Cup team, Wimbledon (1980)
- Luke List – professional golfer, PGA Championship 6th (2019)
- Cheyna Matthews – Jamaican footballer; forward, Washington Spirit, Jamaica women's national team
- Scott A. Muller – Panamanian-American canoeist, whitewater slalom in the K-1 event at the 1996 Summer Olympics
- Andrew Nisker – Canadian professional tennis player, NCAA Men's SEC Singles Champion (2000)
- Joan Pennington – competition swimmer who won one silver and two gold medals at the 1978 World Aquatics Championships, qualified for the 1980 Summer Olympics
- Gil Reese – first three-sport captain (1922–25), halfback on the football team, forward on the basketball team, and outfielder on the baseball team
- Bobby Reynolds – professional tennis player, career-high ATP Tour ranking No. 63 (2009); ATP doubles title with Andy Roddick, RCA Championships (2006)
- Jence Ann Rhoads – professional handball and basketball player, Haukar, Sepsi SIC, ICM Arad; Cupa României (2014); CB Atlético Guardés
- Matthias Schwab – Austrian professional golfer, PGA European Tour
- Peter Sharis – Olympic rower, competed in the men's coxless pair event at the 1992 Summer Olympics
- Astra Sharma – Australian professional tennis player, career-high WTA Tour ranking No. 85 (2019)
- Brandt Snedeker – professional golfer, 2007 PGA Rookie of the Year, 2012 Tour Championship winner
- Chelsea Stewart – Canadian soccer player, defender for the German Bundesliga club SC Freiburg
- Jerry Sularz – Polish soccer player, Górnik Wałbrzych (1967–1973)
- Aleke Tsoubanos – professional tennis player, 4× ITF Women's World Tennis Tour Circuit titles
- Shannon Vreeland – competition swimmer, 2012 United States Olympic team, gold medal in the 4×200-meter freestyle relay at the 2012 London Summer Olympics
- Lily Williams (B.A. 2016) – cyclist, 2020 and 2024 United States Olympic team, gold medal in women's team pursuit at the 2024 Paris Summer Olympics

=== Business and economics ===
- Bilikiss Adebiyi Abiola (M.S.) – Nigerian CEO of Wecyclers in Lagos, Nigeria
- Michael Ainslie (B.A. 1965) – former president and CEO of Sotheby's
- Anu Aiyengar (M.B.A. 1999) – head of mergers and acquisitions at JPMorgan Chase & Co
- Henry C. Alexander (B.A. 1923) – former president, chairman, and CEO of J.P. Morgan & Co.
- James M. Anderson (J.D. 1966) – former president and CEO of the Cincinnati Children's Hospital Medical Center
- John D. Arnold (B.A. 1995) – founder of Centaurus Energy and Arnold Ventures LLC, youngest self-made billionaire in Texas
- Marwan Awad (M.A. 1980) – former CEO of Jordan Ahli Bank
- Bill Bain (B.A. 1959) – founder of Bain & Company
- Thomas W. Beasley (J.D. 1973) – co-founder of CoreCivic
- Horace E. Bemis (B.S. 1891) – founder of the Ozan Lumber Company
- Michael Bickford (B.A.) – founder and CEO of Round Hill Capital
- Dennis C. Bottorff (B.E. 1966) – chairman and CEO of the First American Corporation; co-founder, Council Capital
- James Cowdon Bradford Sr. (College, 1912) – chairman of Piggly Wiggly, founder of J.C. Bradford & Co.
- James W. Bradford (J.D. 1974) – former CEO of AFG Industries
- Michael Burry (M.D. 1997) – founder of the Scion Capital LLC hedge fund, portrayed by Christian Bale in the 2015 film The Big Short
- Kelly Campbell (B.S. 2000) – former president of Peacock and Hulu
- Monroe J. Carell, Jr. (B.S. 1959) – former chairman and CEO of Central Parking Corporation
- Dong-se Cha (M.A. 1974, Ph.D. 1978) – Korean economist, former president of the Korea Development Institute
- Whitefoord Russell Cole (B.A. 1894) – former president of the Louisville and Nashville Railroad
- John Cooper (M.B.A. 1985) – former global head of technology investment banking at Lehman Brothers
- Alejandro E. Martínez Cuenca (Ph.D. 1999) – owner of Joya de Nicaragua
- Mark Dalton (J.D. 1975) – CEO of the Tudor Investment Corporation, Vanderbilt board of trust chairman (2010–2017)
- John Danner (MEd 2002) – co-founder/CEO, Rocketship Education; co-founder, NetGravity, the world's first advertising server company
- Joe C. Davis, Jr. (B.A. 1941) – founder and CEO of Davis Coals, Inc.
- Krista Donaldson (B.E. 1995) – CEO of D-Rev
- David Dyer (B.E. 1971) – former CEO of Land's End and Tommy Hilfiger
- Dan K. Eberhart (B.A.) – CEO of Canary, LLC, managing partner of Eberhart Capital, LLC
- John Edgerton (A.B. 1902, M.A.1903) – industrialist, president of the National Association of Manufacturers (1921–1931)
- John A. Elkington (B.A.) – developer, founding board member of the National Civil Rights Museum
- Bruce R. Evans (B.E. 1981) – managing director of Summit Partners, Vanderbilt board of trust chairman
- David Farr (M.B.A. 1981) – chairman and CEO of Emerson Electric
- Mark L. Feidler (J.D. 1981) – chairman of Equifax
- Erik Feig (1988–89) – president of Lionsgate Motion Picture Group
- Sam Feist (B.A. 1991) – CEO of C-SPAN
- Zula Inez Ferguson (B.A.) – advertising manager at Blackstone's, Los Angeles
- Greg Fischer (B.A. 1980) – co-invented and founded SerVend International, sold to The Manitowoc Company
- Sam M. Fleming (B.A. 1928) – former president of the American Bankers Association
- Adena Friedman (M.B.A. 1993) – president and CEO of NASDAQ
- Thomas F. Frist Jr. (B.A. 1960) – billionaire entrepreneur, co-founder of the Hospital Corporation of America
- Mahni Ghorashi (M.B.A. 2012) – co-founder of Clear Labs
- Mitch Glazier (J.D. 1991) – chairman and CEO of the Recording Industry Association of America
- Francis Guess (M.B.A.) – businessman and civil rights advocate, United States Commission on Civil Rights
- John Hall (B.E. 1955) – former chairman and CEO of Ashland Oil
- Arthur B. Hancock III (B.A. 1965) – owner of thoroughbred racehorses, owner of Stone Farm
- Matthew J. Hart (B.A. 1974) – former chairman and CEO of Hilton Hotels Corporation
- Robert D. Hays (J.D. 1983) – chairman of King & Spalding
- Bruce Henderson (B.S. 1937) – founder of the Boston Consulting Group
- Robert Selph Henry (LL.B 1910, B.A. 1911) – vice president of the Association of American Railroads (1934–1958)
- Bruce Heyman (B.A. 1979, M.B.A. 1980) – vice president and managing director of private wealth management at Goldman Sachs
- Chris Hollod (B.A. 2005) – venture capitalist and angel investor
- David S. Hong (M.A. 1967) – 5th president of the Taiwan Institute of Economic Research
- Frank K. Houston (B.A. 1904) – president and chairman of the Chemical Corn Exchange Bank
- Allan Hubbard (B.A. 1969) – director of the National Economic Council
- David Bronson Ingram (M.B.A. 1989) – chairman and president of Ingram Entertainment
- John R. Ingram (M.B.A. 1986) – billionaire chairman and CEO of the Ingram Content Group
- Orrin H. Ingram II (B.A. 1982) – CEO of Ingram Industries, chairman of the Ingram Barge Company
- Paul Jacobson (MBA 1997) – CFO of Delta Air Lines
- Prashant Khemka (M.B.A. 1998) – former CIO of global emerging markets at Goldman Sachs, founder of White Oak Capital Management
- J. Hicks Lanier (B.A. 1962) – chairman and CEO of Oxford Industries
- Sartain Lanier (B.A. 1931) – chairman and CEO of Oxford Industries
- Mark Lazarus (B.A. 1986) – CEO of Versant; former chairman, NBCUniversal Media; president, Turner Entertainment
- Chong Moon Lee (M.L.S. 1959) – founder of Diamond Multimedia
- Dave Limp (B.S. 1988) – CEO of Blue Origin
- Oliver Luckett (B.A. 1996) – entrepreneur, founded Revver
- Max Lytvyn (M.B.A. 2004) – billionaire co-founder of Grammarly
- Katrina Markoff (B.A. 1995) – founder and CEO of Vosges Haut-Chocolat
- R. Brad Martin (M.B.A. 1980) – chairman of FedEx, former chairman and CEO of Saks, Inc.
- Mark P. Mays (B.A. 1985) – president and CEO of Clear Channel Communications
- Mike McWherter (J.D. 1981) – chairman of the board of First State Bank
- Lydia Meredith (M.B.A) – former CEO of the Renaissance Learning Center
- Todd Miller (B.A. 1988) – media executive, CEO of Celestial Tiger Entertainment
- Ann S. Moore (B.A. 1971) – former chairman and CEO of Time Inc.
- Jackson W. Moore (J.D. 1973) – former executive chairman of Union Planters Bank and Regions Financial Corporation
- J. Reagor Motlow (B.A. 1919) – former president of Jack Daniel's
- Mubyarto (M.A. 1962) – Indonesian economist, developer of Pancasila economics, Bintang Jasa Utama (1994)
- Tim Murray (E.M.B.A. 2003) – CEO of Alba
- Roy Neel (B.A. 1972) – president and CEO of the United States Telecom Association
- Ralph Owen (B.A. 1928) – chairman of American Express
- Doug Parker (M.B.A. 1986) – chairman, president, and CEO of American Airlines Group
- Sunil Paul (B.E. 1987) – entrepreneur, founder of Brightmail, co-founder and CEO of Sidecar
- Brittany Perkins (B.A. 2008) – CEO of AshBritt Environmental
- H. Ross Perot, Jr. (B.A. 1981) – billionaire chairman and CEO of Perot Systems, former owner of the Dallas Mavericks
- Charles Plosser (B.E. 1970) – president of the Federal Reserve Bank of Philadelphia, former co-editor of the Journal of Monetary Economics
- Edgar E. Rand (B.A. 1927) – former president of the International Shoe Company
- Frank C. Rand (B.A. 1898) – former president of the International Shoe Company, Vanderbilt board of trust chairman (1935–1949)
- Henry Hale Rand (B.A. 1929) – former president of the International Shoe Company
- Alexis Readinger (B.A. 1996) – founder of Preen, Inc.
- Mark Reuss (B.A. 1986) – president of General Motors
- Russ Robinson (B.A. 1979) – founder and CEO of Global Steel Dust
- Jeffrey J. Rothschild (B.A. 1977, M.S. 1979) – billionaire entrepreneur and executive, founding engineer of Facebook
- Conner Searcy (B.A. 1996) – private equity investor, co-founder and managing partner, Trive Capital
- Jane Silber (M.S.) – former CEO of Canonical Ltd.
- Albert C. Simmonds Jr. (B.A. 1922) – 18th president of the Bank of New York
- Chip Skowron (B.A. 1990) – portfolio manager at FrontPoint Partners
- John Sloan Jr. (B.A. 1958) – VP of the First American National Bank, President and CEO of the National Federation of Independent Business
- Alexander C. Taylor (B.A. 1997) – president and CEO of Cox Enterprises
- Hall W. Thompson – founder and developer of Shoal Creek Club
- Cal Turner, Jr. (B.A. 1962) – billionaire CEO of Dollar General
- William S. Vaughn (B.A. 1923) – Rhodes Scholar, former president and chairman of Eastman Kodak
- Thomas B. Walker, Jr. (B.A. 1947) – Goldman Sachs senior director, Vanderbilt board of trust
- Emily White (B.A. 2000) – former COO of Snapchat, current board member of Hyperloop One
- Christopher J. Wiernicki (B.S.) – chairman, president, and CEO of American Bureau of Shipping
- Darrin Williams (J.D. 1993) – CEO of Southern Bancorp Inc.
- Jesse Ely Wills (B.A. 1922) – chairman of the National Life and Accident Insurance Company
- David K. Wilson (B.A. 1941) – co-founder, Cherokee Equity; chairman of Genesco; Vanderbilt board of trust chair (1981–91)
- Toby S. Wilt (B.E. 1967) – president, TSW Investment Company, director, CapStar Bank
- Philip C. Wolf (M.B.A. 1980) – founder and CEO of PhoCusWright
- Muhammad Yunus (Ph.D. 1971) – founder of Grameen Bank, pioneer of microcredit; 2006 Nobel Peace Prize winner, 2009 Presidential Medal of Freedom

=== Entertainment and fashion ===
- Laur Allen (B.A. 2011) – actress best known for her role of Juliet Helton on the soap opera series The Young and the Restless
- Rachel Baiman – folk singer-songwriter
- Jim Beavers (M.B.A. 1996) – songwriter, former director of marketing for Capitol Records
- Dierks Bentley (B.A. 1997) – country musician
- Curtis Benton – actor, 20,000 Leagues Under the Sea (1916), Jealousy (1916), Kid Galahad (1937); writer, The Uninvited Guest (1924)
- Cinda Boomershine (B.A. 1994) – founder of fashion accessory line Cinda b
- Harold Bradley* (B.A. 1949) – session guitarist and entrepreneur, Musicians Hall of Fame (2007)
- Joe Bob Briggs (B.A. 1974) – syndicated American film critic, writer, actor, and comic performer
- Logan Browning (B.A. 2011) – actress, lead in Dear White People
- Paula Cale – actress best known for her role as Joanie Hansen on the series Providence
- Rosanne Cash (B.A. 1979) – Grammy Award-winning singer and songwriter
- Fred Coe* – television and Broadway producer and director, Peabody and Emmy Award winner
- Rod Daniel (B.A. 1964) – television and film director best known for the Michael J. Fox film Teen Wolf (1985)
- Kim Dickens (B.A. 1987) – actress, Deadwood (2004–06), Gone Girl (2014), House of Cards (2015–17)
- Deena Dill (B.S. 1992) – actress and television executive producer
- Jimmie Dodd – host of the Walt Disney's The Mickey Mouse Club, actor, Easter Parade (1948), Quicksand (1950)
- George Ducas (B.A. 1989) – country music artist
- Bob Ferguson (M.A.) – Billboard-topping songwriter, senior record producer for RCA Victor
- Chad Gervich (B.A. 1996) – television writer; playwright; author, Small Screen, Big Picture: A Writers Guide to the TV Business
- Amy Grant – six-time Grammy-winning contemporary Christian music artist (dropped out)
- William Gray Espy – actor, The Young and the Restless
- Merle Hazard (J.D. 1993) – satirist known as the "Weird Al of Wall Street"
- Richard Hull (B.A. 1992) – media and entertainment executive; producer, She's All That; 2011 NAACP Image Award
- Claude Jarman Jr. – former child actor, received a special Academy Award as outstanding child actor of 1946 for The Yearling
- Kevin Royal Johnson (B.E. 1984) – singer-songwriter, founding member of The Linemen
- Duncan Jones – British film director, Source Code (2011), Warcraft (2016), Mute (2018), BAFTA Award winner
- Edward Kerr (B.A. 1990) – actor, Pretty Little Liars, starred in Above Suspicion
- Jill King (B.A. 1996) – country music artist
- Lance Kinsey (B.A. 1975) – Canadian actor and screenwriter, best known for his role as Lt. Proctor in the Police Academy film series
- Richard Kyanka (M.A.) – creator of humor website Something Awful
- Susanna Kwan (M.F.A.) – Hong Kong singer and actress, Heart of Greed, Moonlight Resonance
- Lunic (B.S. 1999) – songwriter, singer, electronic musician, and multi-instrumentalist Kaitee Page
- Steven Machat (J.D. 1977) – entertainment mogul and producer
- Chris Mann (B.M. 2004) – singer; fourth place in season 2 of The Voice
- Delbert Mann (B.A. 1941) – Academy Award-winning director for Marty (1955)
- Apple Martin (B.A. 2026) – British model
- Theresa Meeker (M.Ed.) – written, web, and video content creator
- James Melton – popular music actor/singer, Stars over Broadway (1935), Ziegfeld Follies (1945)
- R. Stevie Moore – multi-instrumentalist singer-songwriter who pioneered lo-fi/DIY music
- Zack Norman – entertainer and film financier, known for his role as Ira in Romancing the Stone (1984)
- Bettie Page* (B.A. 1944) – model, 1950s pin-up icon
- Zhubin Parang (B.A. 2003) – head writer of The Daily Show
- Saladin K. Patterson – writer, Frasier, The Bernie Mac Show; creator and executive producer, The Wonder Years
- Woody Paul (B.E. 1977) – member of Riders in the Sky
- Michael Pollack (B.A. 2016) – Grammy-nominated Top 40 songwriter and record producer
- Amy Ray – singer, songwriter, member of the Indigo Girls (transferred)
- Mason Richards (B.S. 1997) – Guyanese-American filmmaker
- Rex Ryon – actor
- Donna Sachet (B.A. 1976) – drag actor, singer, and activist
- Dinah Shore (B.A. 1938) – top-charting female vocalist of the 1940s; actress; television host, The Dinah Shore Show, Dinah!
- Molly Sims – model, actress (dropped out to pursue modeling)
- Brock Speer (M.Div.) – bass singer for the Speer Family Southern Gospel group
- Chris Stapleton (dropped out) – singer-songwriter, guitarist, and record producer
- Stephanie Storey (B.A. 1997) – actress; screenwriter; director; novelist; producer, The Writers' Room
- Amanda Sudano – singer-songwriter, member of Johnnyswim
- Brooklyn Sudano – model, actress, and singer
- Mikey Wax – singer-songwriter
- Tim Weiland (B.A. 2006) – fashion designer and DJ; founder, creative director, Timo Weiland
- Whitney Wolanin (B.S. 2011) – singer and songwriter
- Paul Worley (B.A. 1972) – record producer, discovered Lady Antebellum and the Dixie Chicks
- Andrea Zonn (B.M.) – singer and fiddle player

=== Government, politics, and activism ===
==== U.S. vice presidents ====
- John Nance Garner (Law, 1886) – 32nd vice president of the United States and 39th speaker of the United States House of Representatives
- Al Gore (Div, 1971–72) – 45th vice president of the United States; former U.S. senator; former U.S. representative; environmental activist; Nobel laureate (2007)

==== U.S. Cabinet and heads of federal agencies ====
- Lamar Alexander (B.A. 1962) – 5th U.S. secretary of education
- Paul S. Atkins (J.D. 1983) – 34th chairman of the Securities and Exchange Commission
- Jake Brewer (B.S. 2004) – White House senior policy adviser in the Office of Science and Technology Policy, Obama administration
- H. Lee Buchanan III (B.S. 1971, M.S. 1972) – 4th assistant secretary of the Navy (Research, Development and Acquisition)
- Robert W. Cobb (B.A. 1982) – NASA inspector general (2002–2009)
- Tom Cochran (B.A.) – White House director of New Media Technologies, Obama administration
- Bill Corr (J.D. 1973) – 9th deputy secretary of the United States Department of Health and Human Services
- James Danly (J.D. 2013) – commissioner of the Federal Energy Regulatory Commission
- Norman Davis – 2nd under secretary of state; represented the U.S. at the Paris Peace Conference, League of Nations, and Geneva Conference
- Paul Rand Dixon (B.A. 1936) – former chairman and 14th commissioner of the Federal Trade Commission (1961–1969, 1976)
- John Edgerton (B.A. 1902, M.A. 1903) – held economic executive appointments by President Warren G. Harding and President Herbert Hoover
- William Yandell Elliott (B.A. 1918) – member of the Fugitives, Rhodes Scholar, political advisor to six U.S. presidents
- Phyllis Fong (J.D. 1978) – inspector general of the United States Department of Agriculture
- Vince Foster – former deputy White House chief of staff
- David Fotouhi (B.A. 2007) – deputy administrator of the U.S. Environmental Protection Agency
- J. Christopher Giancarlo (J.D. 1984) – 38th chairman of the United States Commodity Futures Trading Commission (CFTC)
- Tipper Gore (M.A. 1975) – activist, 35th Second Lady of the United States
- E. William Henry (J.D. 1957) – 14th chairman of the Federal Communications Commission
- Allan B. Hubbard (B.A. 1969) – economic adviser to President George W. Bush, 6th director of the National Economic Council
- Gus Hunt (B.E. 1977, M.E. 1982) – chief technology officer at the CIA
- Mickey Kantor (B.A. 1951) – 11th U.S. trade representative, 31st United States secretary of commerce
- Robert L. King (J.D. 1971) – assistant secretary of Education, serving as head of the Office of Postsecondary Education
- Bill Lacy (B.A.) – political operative, business executive, and director of the Robert J. Dole Institute of Politics
- Howard Liebengood (J.D. 1967) – 27th sergeant at arms of the United States Senate
- James McHenry III (MA, JD 2003) – director, Executive Office for Immigration Review, acting attorney general of the United States
- Marvin H. McIntyre – 17th secretary to the President of the United States, Franklin D. Roosevelt
- James Clark McReynolds (B.S. 1882) – 48th attorney general of the United States
- Roy Neel (B.A. 1972) – deputy chief of staff for former president Bill Clinton; 8th chief of staff for Al Gore
- Paul C. Ney Jr. (JD, MBA 1984) – general counsel of the Department of Defense of the United States, Trump administration
- Steve Owens (J.D. 1981) – chairman of the U.S. Chemical Safety Board
- Jerry Parr (B.A. 1962) – United States Secret Service agent, credited with helping to save President Reagan's life on the day of his assassination attempt
- Stephen D. Potts (B.A. 1952, LL.B 1954) – 4th director of the United States Office of Government Ethics
- Roger Ream (B.A. 1977) – president of the Fund for American Studies (TFAS)
- Phil Reitinger (B.E. 1984) – former director of the National Cybersecurity Center at the Department of Homeland Security
- Michael Shaheen (J.D. 1965) – 1st director of the U.S. Department of Justice Office of Professional Responsibility
- John Wesley Snyder – 54th U.S. secretary of the Treasury
- Hans von Spakovsky (J.D. 1984) – 22nd Federal Election Commission commissioner
- Nancy Soderberg (B.A. 1980) – foreign policy advisor, strategist, U.S. National Security Council, representative to the United Nations Security Council
- Jay Solomon (B.A. 1942) – 10th administrator of the General Services Administration
- John R. Steelman (M.A. 1924) – 1st White House chief of staff, Truman Administration
- Gordon O. Tanner (J.D. 1973) – general counsel of the Air Force
- Jon R. Thomas (M.A. 1995) – assistant secretary of state for International Narcotics Matters, United Nations Commission on Narcotic Drugs
- John J. Tigert (B.A. 1904) – 7th U.S. commissioner of Education
- Stephen Vaden (B.A.) – general counsel of the United States Department of Agriculture, Trump administration
- Carlos Clark Van Leer (LL.B 1895) – chief of the Personnel Classification Board, United States Department of the Treasury
- Stephen Vaughn (B.A. 1988) – former acting U.S. trade representative, general counsel to the United States Trade Representative
- Jack Watson (B.A. 1960) – 9th White House chief of staff, Carter Administration
- Gus W. Weiss (B.A.) – White House policy adviser on technology, intelligence and economic affairs, worked on the Farewell Dossier

==== U.S. governors ====
- Greg Abbott (J.D. 1984) – 48th governor of Texas (2015– )
- Lamar Alexander (B.A. 1962) – 45th governor of Tennessee (1979–1987)
- Andy Beshear (B.A. 2000) – 61st governor of Kentucky (2019– )
- Theodore Bilbo (Peabody, Law, 1900) – 39th and 43rd governor of Mississippi (1916–1920; 1928–1932)
- Frank G. Clement – 41st governor of Tennessee (1963–1967)
- Prentice Cooper (Col 1914–1916) – 39th governor of Tennessee (1939–1945)
- Lee Cruce (Law, 1885) – 2nd governor of Oklahoma (1911–1915)
- Jeff Davis (Law, 1882) – 20th governor of Arkansas (1901–1907)
- William Haselden Ellerbe – 86th governor of South Carolina (1897–1899)
- Joseph W. Folk (LL.B 1890) – 31st governor of Missouri (1905–1909)
- Hill McAlister (LL.B 1897) – 34th governor of Tennessee (1933–1937)
- Malcolm R. Patterson (Law, 1882) – 30th governor of Tennessee (1907–1911)
- Park Trammell – 21st governor of Florida (1913–1917)

==== U.S. senators ====
- Lamar Alexander (B.A. 1962) – United States senator from Tennessee (2003–2021)
- Theodore Bilbo (Peabody, Law, 1900) – United States senator from Mississippi (1935–1947)
- Jeff Davis – United States senator from Arkansas (1907–1913)
- Nathaniel B. Dial – United States senator from South Carolina (1919–1925)
- James Eastland (Col 1925–1926) – United States senator from Mississippi (1943–1978), president pro tempore (1972–1978)
- Duncan U. Fletcher (LL.B 1880) – United States senator from Florida (1909–1936), led the Pecora Commission
- Bill Hagerty (B.A. 1981, J.D. 1984) – United States senator from Tennessee (2021– )
- John Neely Kennedy (B.A. 1973) – United States senator from Louisiana (2017– )
- Harlan Mathews (MPA 1958) – United States senator from Tennessee (1993–1994)
- Floyd M. Riddick (M.A. 1932) – parliamentarian of the United States Senate (1964–1974), developed Riddick's Senate procedure
- Jim Sasser (B.A. 1958, LL.B 1961) – United States senator from Tennessee (1977–1995)
- William V. Sullivan (LL.B 1875) – United States senator from Mississippi (1898–1901)
- Fred Dalton Thompson (J.D. 1967) – United States senator from Tennessee (1994–2003)
- Park Trammell – United States senator from Florida (1917–1936)

==== U.S. representatives ====
- William Vollie Alexander, Jr. (J.D. 1960) – United States representative from Arkansas (1969–1993)
- Robert E. Lee Allen* – United States representative from West Virginia (1923–1925)
- James Benjamin Aswell* (B.A. 1893) – United States representative from Louisiana (1913–1931)
- Richard Merrill Atkinson (B.A. 1916) – United States representative from Tennessee (1937–1939)
- Jim Bacchus (B.A. 1971) – United States representative from Florida (1991–1995)
- Laurie C. Battle – United States representative from Alabama (1947–1955)
- Robin Beard (B.A. 1961) – United States representative from Tennessee (1973–1983)
- Richard Walker Bolling (grad. studies 1939–1940) – United States representative from Missouri (1979–1983)
- Bill Boner (M.A. 1969) – United States representative from Tennessee (1979–1987)
- John L. Burnett (Law 1876) – United States representative from Alabama (1899–1919)
- Jo Byrns (LL.B 1882) – 41st speaker of the United States House of Representatives
- Joseph W. Byrns Jr. (J.D. 1928) – United States representative from Tennessee (1938–1941)
- Steve Cohen (B.A. 1971) – United States representative from Tennessee (2007– )
- W. Wirt Courtney – United States representative from Tennessee (1939–1949)
- Ewin L. Davis (Col. 1895–97) – United States representative from Tennessee (1919–1933)
- William A. Dickson – United States representative from Mississippi (1909–1913)
- Joe L. Evins (B.A. 1933) – United States representative from Tennessee (1953–1977)
- John W. Gaines (M.D. 1882) – United States representative from Tennessee (1897–1909)
- William Wirt Hastings (J.D. 1889) – United States representative from Oklahoma (1915–1921)
- French Hill (B.S. 1978) – United States representative from Arkansas (2015– )
- Sam Hobbs – United States representative from Alabama (1935–1951)
- Henderson M. Jacoway (J.D. 1898) – United States representative from Arkansas (1911–1923)
- Joseph T. Johnson (LL.B 1883) – United States representative from South Carolina (1901–1915)
- Ric Keller (J.D. 1992) – United States representative from Florida (2001–2009)
- Richard Kelly – United States representative from Florida (1975–1981)
- Jen Kiggans (M.S.N 2012) – United States representative from Virginia (2023– )
- Charles Landon Knight (B.A. 1889) – United States representative from Ohio (1921–1923)
- Charles M. La Follette (J.D.) – United States representative from Indiana (1943–1947)
- Leonard Lance (J.D. 1977) – United States representative from New Jersey (2009–2019)
- Fritz G. Lanham (Law, 1897–98) – United States representative from Texas (1919–1947)
- Oscar Lovette (J.D. 1896) – United States representative from Tennessee (1931–1933)
- Luke Messer (J.D. 1994) – United States representative from Indiana (2013–2019)
- Malcolm R. Patterson (Law, 1882) – United States representative from Tennessee (1901–1906)
- James Percy Priest* – United States representative from Tennessee (1941–1956)
- Ben Quayle (J.D. 2002) – United States representative from Arizona (2011–2013)
- Frazier Reams (J.D. 1922) – United States representative from Ohio (1951–1955)
- Charles C. Reid (J.D. 1887) – United States representative from Arkansas (1901–1911)
- John Rose (J.D. 1993) – United States representative from Tennessee (2019– )
- J. William Stokes (M.D. 1888) – United States representative from South Carolina (1896–1901)
- Charles Swindall – United States representative from Oklahoma (1920–1921)
- Joseph E. Washington (LL.B 1874) – United States representative from Tennessee (1887–1897)

==== U.S. Supreme Court justices ====
- James Clark McReynolds (B.S. 1882) – associate justice of the Supreme Court of the United States (1914–1941)

==== U.S. ambassadors and diplomats ====
- Alvin P. Adams Jr. (LL.B 1967) – former U.S. ambassador to Peru, Haiti, and Djibouti
- Waldo Emerson Bailey* (M.A. 1927) – U.S. consul to London, England
- John Barrett – former U.S. ambassador to Colombia, Panama, and Argentina
- William J. Cabaniss (B.A. 1960) – 5th U.S. ambassador to the Czech Republic
- Roxanne Cabral (B.A.) – 10th U.S. ambassador to the Marshall Islands
- Brian E. Carlson (B.A. 1969) – 10th U.S. ambassador to Latvia
- William Prentice Cooper, Jr. – 31st U.S. ambassador to Peru
- Marion V. Creekmore Jr. (B.A. 1961) – 8th U.S. ambassador to Sri Lanka and the Maldives
- K. Terry Dornbush (B.A. 1955) – 60th U.S. ambassador to the Netherlands
- Guilford Dudley (B.A. 1929) – 49th U.S. ambassador to Denmark
- Thomas C. Ferguson (B.A. 1955, J.D. 1959) – 2nd U.S. ambassador to Brunei
- William Hagerty (B.A. 1981, J.D. 1984) – 30th U.S. ambassador to Japan
- Bruce Heyman (B.A. 1979, M.B.A. 1980) – 30th U.S. ambassador to Canada
- Greta C. Holtz (B.S. 1982) – U.S. ambassador to Oman and Qatar
- Marshall Fletcher McCallie (B.A. 1967) – 2nd U.S. ambassador to Namibia
- Louis J. Nigro Jr. (Ph.D. 1979) – 19th U.S. ambassador to Chad
- W. Robert Pearson (B.A. 1965) – 23rd U.S. ambassador to Turkey, president of IREX
- Gautam A. Rana (J.D. 1997) – 10th U.S. ambassador to Slovakia
- Jim Sasser (B.A. 1958, J.D. 1961) – 44th U.S. ambassador to China
- Nicole D. Theriot (M.A.) – 25th U.S. ambassador to Guyana
- Linda Ellen Watt (B.A. 1973) – 36th U.S. ambassador to Panama

==== Mayors ====
- Megan Barry (MBA 1993) – former mayor of Nashville Tennessee
- Ann Womer Benjamin (B.A. 1975) – mayor of Aurora, Ohio
- Bill Boner (M.A. 1969) – former mayor of Nashville, Tennessee
- Beverly Briley – former mayor of Nashville, Tennessee
- Bill Campbell (B.A. 1974) – former mayor of Atlanta, Georgia
- John Cooper (M.B.A. 1985) – mayor of Nashville, Tennessee
- Thomas L. Cummings Sr. (J.D. 1915) – former mayor of Nashville, Tennessee
- Karl Dean (J.D. 1981) – former mayor of Nashville, Tennessee
- J. Kane Ditto (J.D. 1969) – former mayor of Jackson, Mississippi
- Greg Fischer (B.A. 1980) – mayor of Louisville, Kentucky
- Alyia Gaskins (B.A. 2010) – mayor of Alexandria, Virginia
- Jim Gray (B.A. 1975) – former mayor of Lexington, Kentucky
- Dorsey B. Hardeman (LL.B 1931) – former mayor of San Angelo, Texas
- Pam Hemminger (B.A. 1982) – mayor of Chapel Hill, North Carolina
- Nelson Madore (Ed.D. 1982) – former mayor of Waterville, Maine
- Dee Margo (B.A. 1974) – mayor of El Paso, Texas
- Bill Purcell (J.D. 1979) – former mayor of Nashville, Tennessee
- Steven Reed (MBA 2004) – mayor of Montgomery, Alabama
- Woodall Rodgers (B.A. 1912) – mayor of Dallas, Texas
- Henry Scales (B.A. 1891) – former mayor of Oklahoma City
- Sam Sutter (J.D. 1983) – former mayor of Fall River, Massachusetts
- Tom Tait (J.D., M.B.A. 1985) – mayor of Anaheim, California
- Joseph Vas (B.A) – former mayor of Perth Amboy, New Jersey
- Ben West – former mayor of Nashville, Tennessee

==== Other U.S. state officials ====
- Jon Applebaum (B.A. 2007) – former member of the Minnesota House of Representatives
- Vernon Barnett (B.A. 1992) – CEO of the Alabama Department of Revenue
- Bruce Bennett (J.D. 1949) – 38th attorney general of Arkansas
- Preston Lang Bethea* (B.A. 1891) – member of the South Carolina Senate
- Bob Blake (LL.B 1908) – Rhodes Scholar; president, 1944 Missouri Constitutional Convention
- Will Bond (B.A. 1992) – member of the Arkansas Senate
- William West Bond (B.A. 1907) – 62nd speaker of the Tennessee Senate
- George Street Boone (J.D. 1941) – member of the Kentucky House of Representatives
- Peter Breen (B.E. 1997) – member of the Illinois House of Representatives
- Dick Brewbaker (B.S. 1983) – former member of the Alabama Senate
- Tony Brown (M.A.) – former member of the Kansas House of Representatives
- Lance Cargill (J.D. 1996) – lawyer and former speaker of the Oklahoma House of Representatives
- William Prentice Cooper, Sr. (B.A. 1890) – speaker of the Tennessee House of Representatives
- Brad Courtney (B.A. 1981) – chairman of the Republican Party of Wisconsin
- Alexander G. Crockett (M.D. 1885) – former member of the Virginia Senate
- Cal Cunningham – former member of the North Carolina Senate
- Riley Darnell (J.D. 1965) – 37th Tennessee secretary of state
- Walter Naylor Davis (B.A. 1898) – 34th lieutenant governor of Missouri
- Neria Douglass (J.D. 1977) – 50th Maine state treasurer
- Natalie Phelps Finnie (M.S. 2011) – former director of the Illinois Department of Natural Resources
- Steve Freudenthal (J.D. 1975) – 28th attorney general of Wyoming
- Chris Gebhard (B.A. 1996) – member of the Pennsylvania Senate
- Bill Gibbons (J.D.) – district attorney general of Memphis, Tennessee
- Mary Stuart Gile (Ed.D. 1982) – former member of the New Hampshire House of Representatives
- Michele Guyton (B.A. 1989) – member of the Maryland House of Delegates
- Dorsey B. Hardeman (LL.B 1931) – former member of the Texas House of Representatives and the Texas Senate
- Thomas Alan Harris – former member of the Tennessee House of Representatives and the Tennessee Senate
- William C. Harrison (Ed.D. 1985) – former chairman of the North Carolina State Board of Education
- Beth Harwell (M.S. 1979, Ph.D. 1982) – 81st speaker of the Tennessee House of Representatives; board member, Tennessee Valley Authority
- Douglas Henry (B.A. 1949, J.D. 1951) – member of the Tennessee Senate, activist
- Roy Herron (J.D. 1980, M.Div. 1980) – former chairman of the Tennessee Democratic Party
- Ashley Hudson (B.A. 2001) – member of the Arkansas House of Representatives
- David J. Jordan (J.D. 1979) – chair of the Board of Regents of the Utah System of Higher Education
- Jonathan Jordan (M.B.A. 1992) – former member of the North Carolina House of Representatives
- Harold A. Katz (B.A. 1943) – former member of the Illinois House of Representatives
- Robert L. King (J.D.) – former member of the New York State Assembly
- Naomi C. Matusow (B.A. 1960) – member of the New York State Assembly
- William Harding Mayes (LL.B 1881) – lieutenant governor of Texas
- Mindy McAlindon (B.S.) – member of the Arkansas House of Representatives
- Eugene Brooks McLemore (J.D.) – former Tennessee attorney general
- J. Washington Moore (B.A. 1890, LL.B 1891) – eminent supreme archon of Sigma Alpha Epsilon, 1891–1894
- William L. Moose (B.A. 1879) – former President of the Arkansas Senate
- Seth Walker Norman – former member of the Tennessee House of Representatives
- Mary Margaret Oliver (B.A. 1969) – member of the Georgia House of Representatives
- Howard T. Owens Jr. (J.D. 1959) – former member of the Connecticut Senate
- E. Melvin Porter (J.D. 1959) – member of the Oklahoma Senate, civil rights leader
- Atif Qarni (Ed.D. 2024) – 19th Virginia secretary of Education
- Barbara Rusling (B.A. 1966) – former member of the Texas House of Representatives
- Edward T. Seay (LL.B 1891) – former speaker of the Tennessee Senate
- Amanda Septimo (B.A. 2021) – member of the New York State Assembly
- Umair A. Shah (B.A.) – former Secretary of Health of Washington
- David Simmons (J.D. 1977) – president pro tempore of the Florida Senate
- David Simpson (B.A. 1983) – former member of the Texas House of Representatives
- W. P. Sims (B.A. 1899) – former member of the Arizona Senate
- Charlie Stallworth (M.Div.) – member of the Connecticut House of Representatives
- Joe Straus (B.A. 1982) – speaker of the Texas House of Representatives
- Jim Summerville (M.A. 1983) – former member of the Tennessee Senate
- John Peroutt Taylor (M.D. 1881) – 32nd Mississippi state treasurer
- Paul Thurmond (B.S. 1998) – former member of the South Carolina Senate
- Joseph Vas (B.A) – former member of the New Jersey General Assembly
- Jody Wagner (J.D. 1980) – 12th Virginia secretary of Finance
- David Wasinger (J.D. 1988) – 49th lieutenant governor of Missouri
- Justin P. Wilson (J.D. 1970) – lawyer, comptroller of Tennessee

==== Foreign presidents, prime ministers, heads of government ====
- Abdiweli Mohamed Ali (M.A. 1988) – 15th prime minister of Somalia, 8th president of Puntland
- Chung Won-shik (M.A. 1958, Ph.D. 1966) – 21st prime minister of South Korea
- José Ramón Guizado (B.E. 1920) – 17th president of Panama
- Thomas C. Jefferson, OBE (M.A. 1975) – 1st premier of the Cayman Islands
- Muhammad Yunus (Ph.D. 1971) – 6th chief adviser of Bangladesh

==== Other foreign officials ====
- Jawad Anani (M.A. 1970) – former minister of Labor of Jordan, former chief of the Royal Court
- Lawrence Ang – director of the Commercial Affairs Department of Singapore
- Marwan Awad (M.A. 1980) – former minister of Finance of Jordan
- Jim Bacchus (B.A. 1971) – former chairman of the Appellate Body of the World Trade Organization
- Bijaya Nath Bhattarai (M.A. 1979) – 13th governor of the Nepal Rastra Bank
- Abdallah Bou Habib (Ph.D. 1975) – 48th minister of Foreign Affairs of Lebanon
- Grace Coleman (M.A. 1979) – former MP of Ghana and Ghanaian ambassador to the Netherlands
- Yeda Crusius (M.A. 1971) – 36th governor of the Brazilian state of Rio Grande do Sul
- María de Lourdes Dieck-Assad (M.A. 1976) – former Mexican ambassador to Belgium and Luxembourg; European Council representative
- Dian Triansyah Djani (M.A. 1989) – former president of the UN Security Council, Indonesian permanent representative
- Abu Hena Mohammad Razee Hassan (M.A.) – chief executive, Bangladesh Financial Intelligence Unit
- Patrick Ho (M.D. 1976) – 4th secretary for Home Affairs, Hong Kong
- Ow Chin Hock (M.A. 1968, Ph.D. 1972) – former People's Action Party MP of Singapore
- Arturo Huenchullán (Ed.D.) – member Chamber of Deputies of Chile; 1925-27 president, Sociedad Caupolicán Defensora de la Araucanía
- Mario Miguel Carrillo Huerta (M.A. 1976) – member of the Chamber of Deputies of the LXII Legislature of the Mexican Congress
- Kwon Hyouk-se (M.A. 1998) – 8th governor of the Financial Supervisory Service of South Korea
- Sushil Khadka (M.A.) – member of the House of Representatives, Pratinidhi Sabha, Nepal
- Abdallah Kigoda (M.A. 1980) – 8th minister of Industry and Trade of Tanzania
- Redley A. Killion (M.A. 1978) – 6th vice president of Micronesia
- Irek Kusmierczyk (Ph.D. 2010) – member of the Parliament of Canada for Windsor—Tecumseh
- Liang Kuo-shu (Ph.D. 1970) – 14th governor of the Central Bank of the Republic of China
- Ashwin Mahesh (M.S. 1993) – former national vice president of the Lok Satta Party in India
- Moshe Mendelbaum (M.A. 1960) – 4th governor of the Bank of Israel
- Dante Mossi (Ph.D. 1996) – executive president of the Central American Bank for Economic Integration
- Yoo Myung-hee (J.D. 2002) – former minister of Trade of South Korea
- Ann Therese Ndong-Jatta (M.S. 1984) – former minister of Education of Gambia
- Ihor Petrashko (M.B.A. 2001) – 3rd minister of Economic Development and Trade of Ukraine
- Pedro Pinto Rubianes – 44th vice president of Ecuador
- Syahril Sabirin (Ph.D. 1979) – 11th governor of the Bank of Indonesia
- Baso Sangqu (M.A. 1999) – former president of the UN Security Council, South African permanent representative
- Süreyya Serdengeçti (M.A. 1986) – Turkish economist and 11th governor of the Central Bank of Turkey
- Kwak Seung-Jun (M.S. 1986) – former chairman of the Presidential Council for Future and Vision, South Korea
- Soemarno Sosroatmodjo (M.A.) – 5th governor of Jakarta, Indonesia
- Wang Tso-jung (M.A. 1958) – 6th president of the Control Yuan of the Government of the Republic of China, Order of Propitious Clouds (2013)

==== Activists ====
- Will W. Alexander (B.Th. 1912) – founder of the Commission on Interracial Cooperation
- John Amaechi, OBE – English psychologist, consultant, first former NBA player to come out publicly (transferred)
- Akosua Adomako Ampofo (Ph.D. 2000) – Ghanaian public intellectual, activist and scholar, Fulbright Scholar
- Elizabeth Lee Bloomstein (B.A. 1877 Peabody) – American history professor, clubwoman, and suffragist
- David Boaz (B.A. 1975) – executive vice president, Cato Institute, leading libertarian thinker
- Yun Chi-ho (Div. 1888–1891) – political activist and thinker during the late 1800s and early 1900s in Joseon Korea
- George Childress* (B.A. 1826 Peabody) – lawyer, politician, and a principal author of the Texas Declaration of Independence
- J. McRee Elrod* (M.A. 1953) – Methodist activist for the Civil Rights Movement, anti-war movements of the 1960s, and the gay pride movement
- Hiram Wesley Evans – dental student (did not graduate), Imperial Wizard of the Ku Klux Klan
- Peter Farb (B.A. 1950) – author and noted spokesman for environmental conservation
- Tom Fox (B.A. 1973) – Quaker peace activist, kidnapped on November 26, 2005, in Baghdad, leading to the 2005–2006 Christian Peacemaker hostage crisis
- Morris Frank (B.A. 1929) – founder of The Seeing Eye, the first guide-dog school in the United States, activist for accessibility for the visually impaired
- John E. Fryer (M.D. 1962) – gay rights activist known for his anonymous speech at the 1972 American Psychiatric Association conference where he appeared in disguise as Dr. Henry Anonymous
- Bennett Haselton (M.A.) – founder of Circumventor.com and Peacefire.org, listed in Google Vulnerability Program Hall of Fame for finding and fixing security holes in Google products
- John Jay Hooker (J.D. 1957) – lawyer, entrepreneur, political gadfly, special assistant to Robert F. Kennedy
- Rhoda Kaufman (B.S. 1909) – social activist; White House Conference on Social Work, Hoover administration; League of Women Voters; UN Women's Organization
- Howard Kester (B.D. 1931) – clergyman and social reformer, organized the Southern Tenant Farmers Union designed by President Franklin D. Roosevelt
- Sarah McKelley King – political candidate, 33rd president general of the Daughters of the American Revolution
- George Ross Kirkpatrick – anti-militarist writer and political activist, 1916 vice presidential nominee of the Socialist Party of America
- James Lawson (M.Div. 1960) – civil rights pioneer
- Millicent Lownes-Jackson (M.B.A., Ph.D.) – founder, World Institute for Sustainable Education and Research
- Sara Alderman Murphy (B.A. 1945) – civil rights activist, founder of Peace Links
- Marie Ragghianti (B.S. 1975) – parole board administrator, whistleblower who exposed Ray Blanton's "clemency for cash" scandal
- Arthur F. Raper (M.A. 1925) – sociologist, Commission on Interracial Cooperation
- Charlie Soong (B.Th. 1885) – Chinese missionary and businessman, key figure in the Xinhai Revolution of 1911, father of the Soong sisters
- Julie Tien (M.L.S.) – Taiwanese politician and activist, National Women's League of Taiwan
- Madhavi Venkatesan (B.A., M.A., Ph.D.) – economist and environmental activist, founder and executive director of Sustainable Practices
- Don West (D.Div. 1932) – civil rights activist, labor organizer, poet, educator
- Marie C. Wilson (B.A. 1962) – founder and president emerita of The White House Project, founder of Ms. Foundation for Women
- Wolf Wolfensberger* (Ph.D. 1962) – influencer of disability policy through his development of social role valorization, exposed Nazi death camp targeting of the disabled

=== Journalism and media ===
- Michelle Alexander (B.A. 1989) – author of The New Jim Crow, columnist for The New York Times, Truman Scholar
- Joseph Alexander Altsheler – reporter and editor, New York World
- Thomas J. Anderson (B.A. 1934) – columnist and publisher, American Party presidential nominee in 1976
- Rankin Barbee – Profiles columnist for The Washington Post, presidential public relations writer for Franklin D. Roosevelt
- Skip Bayless (B.A. 1974) – former lead sports columnist, Chicago Tribune; commentator, ESPN's First Take, FOX's Skip and Shannon: Undisputed
- William E. Beard (B.A. 1893) – journalist, war correspondent, naval historian
- Roy Blount Jr. (B.A 1963) – humorist, sportswriter, and author
- Mel Bradford (Ph.D. 1962) – paleoconservative political commentator
- David Brinkley – broadcast journalist, NBC and ABC; Emmy and Peabody Award winner; Presidential Medal of Freedom (1992)
- Samuel Ashley Brown (Ph.D. 1958) – founder of the literary magazine Shenandoah
- Innis Brown (B.A. 1906) – sporting editor of The Atlanta Journal, Rhodes Scholar
- Deena Clark (M.A.) – television news reporter and journalist, The Deena Clark Show on CBS
- Lorianne Crook (B.A. 1978) – radio and television host, co-host of Crook & Chase
- Terrance Dean (M.A., Ph.D.) – former MTV executive and author of Hiding in Hip-Hop
- Alonso Duralde (B.A. 1988) – senior film critic, The Wrap; syndicate writer, Reuters
- Linda Ellerbee (A&S 1962–64) – journalist for NBC News, host of Nick News with Linda Ellerbee
- Eric Etheridge (B.A. 1979) – first editor of George magazine; author, Breach of Peace (2008)
- Frye Gaillard (B.A. 1968) – former editor at The Charlotte Observer
- Willie Geist (B.A. 1997) – humorist and host on NBC's Today, anchor of Sunday Today with Willie Geist, co-anchor of MSNBC's Morning Joe
- Laurentino Gomes – Brazilian journalist and writer, author of 1808 and 1822
- John Steele Gordon (B.A. 1966) – business and finance writer, Wall Street Journal contributor
- Fred Graham (LL.B 1959) – chief anchor and managing editor of the former Court TV, legal correspondent for the New York Times, and CBS News
- Clint Grant – photojournalist featured in Paris Match, Newsweek, Time, and Life, covered the assassination of John F. Kennedy
- Amelia Greenhall (B.E. 2009) – co-founder and executive director of Double Union, tech blogger
- George Zhibin Gu – Chinese political and economic journalist
- Alex Heard (B.A. 1980) – editorial director of Outside magazine; editor and writer for The New York Times Magazine, The New Republic, The Washington Post and Slate
- Molly Henneberg (B.S. 1995) – correspondent, Fox News
- Hunter Hillenmeyer (B.A. 2003) – financial columnist for TheStreet.com
- Henry Blue Kline (M.A. 1929) – member of the Southern Agrarians
- Hildy Kuryk (B.A. 1999) – director of communications, Vogue; former national finance director, Democratic National Committee
- Paul Lakeland (Ph.D. 1981) – British author, contributing blogger to The Huffington Post and a contributing writer to Commonweal
- Jincey Lumpkin (B.A. 2002) – producer and columnist for the Huffington Post, named one of the 100 most influential gay people by Out Magazine
- Andrew Maraniss (B.A. 1992) – author of Strong Inside: Perry Wallace and the Collision of Race and Sports in the South
- Ralph McGill (B.A. 1916) – anti-segregationist Atlanta Constitution editor and publisher, 1959 Pulitzer Prize for Editorial Writing
- Don McNay (M.A.) – financial author and The Huffington Post contributor
- Buster Olney (B.A. 1988) – ESPN baseball writer, former sportswriter for The New York Times
- Richard Quest – British reporter, anchor for CNN International
- Wendell Rawls, Jr. (B.A. 1970) – journalist at The Philadelphia Inquirer and The New York Times, 1977 Pulitzer Prize for Investigative Reporting
- Grantland Rice (B.A. 1901) – sportswriter, Atlanta Journal, Cleveland News, New York Tribune; namesake, Grantland Rice Trophy
- Fred Russell (B.A. 1927) – sportswriter, Golden Era of Sports, Saturday Evening Post
- Christine Sadler* (B.A. 1927) – pioneer female journalist; reporter and Sunday editor, The Washington Post; Washington, D.C., editor, McCall's
- Jeffrey D. Sadow (Ph.D. 1985) – political scientist, columnist
- Sebastião Salgado (M.A. 1968) – Brazilian social documentary photographer and photojournalist, UNICEF goodwill ambassador, Académie des Beaux-Arts
- James Sandler (M.S. 2012) – investigative journalist, New York Times, PBS Frontline; 2004 Pulitzer Prize for Public Service (team)
- Edward Schumacher-Matos (B.A. 1968) – former ombudsman, NPR; reporter; The New York Times and The Wall Street Journal; op-ed columnist, The Washington Post; 1980 Pulitzer Prize (team)
- John Seigenthaler – founding editorial director of USA Today, First Amendment rights advocate, founder of the First Amendment Center
- Elaine Shannon (B.A. 1968) – investigative journalist, former political correspondent for Newsweek and Time
- Jim Squires (B.A. 1966) – former editor of the Chicago Tribune
- James G. Stahlman (B.A. 1916) – publisher of the Nashville Banner, philanthropist, Maria Moors Cabot Prize winner
- Bill Steltemeier (B.A., J.D.) – founding president of the Eternal Word Television Network (EWTN)
- Clay Travis (J.D. 2004) – radio host
- William Ridley Wills (B.A. 1956) – novelist, poet and journalist, member of the Fugitive group, Sunday Editor for the New York World
- Edwin Wilson (B.A. 1950) – theater critic for The Wall Street Journal (1972–1994), former president of the New York Drama Critics' Circle
- E. Thomas Wood (B.A. 1986) – author and journalist

=== Law ===
==== Attorneys ====
- Lawrence Barcella (J.D. 1970) – criminal defense lawyer, assistant U.S. attorney for the District of Columbia, lead counsel for the House October Surprise Task Force
- Lucius E. Burch Jr. (B.A. 1930, J.D. 1936) – attorney, best known for his contributions to conservation, civil rights movement and being attorney for Martin Luther King Jr.
- Donald Q. Cochran (B.A. 1980, J.D. 1992) – United States attorney for the United States District Court for the Middle District of Tennessee
- Bobby Lee Cook – defense attorney, inspiration for the television series Matlock main character Ben Matlock, which starred Andy Griffith as a Georgia attorney
- Ryan Crosswell (B.A. 2003) – former federal prosecutor for the U.S. Justice Department in the Public Integrity Section
- Hickman Ewing (B.A. 1964) – United States attorney, special prosecutor who oversaw the Whitewater investigation
- Zachary T. Fardon (B.A. 1988, J.D. 1992) – United States attorney for the Northern District of Illinois, U.S. attorney in Chicago, appointed by Barack Obama
- Alice S. Fisher (B.A. 1989) – managing partner of the Washington, D.C., office of Latham & Watkins LLP., former assistant attorney general for the Criminal Division of the US Department of Justice
- Sylvan Gotshal (B.A. 1917) – lawyer, known for his advocacy of industrial design rights, founding partner of Weil, Gotshal & Manges
- Margie Pitts Hames (J.D. 1961) – civil rights lawyer who argued the abortion rights case Doe v. Bolton before the U.S. Supreme Court
- Marci Hamilton (B.A. 1979) – lawyer, won Boerne v. Flores (1997), Constitutional law scholar, Fox Family Pavilion Distinguished Scholar at the University of Pennsylvania
- Robert J. Kabel (J.D. 1972) – attorney and lobbyist with Faegre Baker Daniels, involved in developing the Gramm–Leach–Bliley Act (1999) and the Dodd-Frank Act (2010)
- John Bell Keeble (LL.B 1888) – attorney, co-founded Keeble, Seay, Stockwell and Keeble, Vanderbilt University Law School Dean (1915–29)
- Jack Kershaw (B.A. 1935) – attorney and sculptor who represented James Earl Ray
- James C. Kirby (B.A. 1950) – former chief counsel to the U.S. Senate Judiciary Subcommittee on the Constitution, co-authored the 25th Amendment to the United States Constitution
- Charles M. La Follette (J.D.) – deputy chief of counsel for the post-World War II Nuremberg Trials (1947)
- Alice Martin (B.S. 1978) – former United States Attorney who amassed 140 public corruption convictions and collected approximately $750M in qui tam healthcare fraud settlements
- James F. Neal (J.D. 1957) – trial lawyer, Watergate prosecutor who prosecuted Jimmy Hoffa and top officials of the Nixon Administration, special investigator of the Abscam and Iran-contra scandals
- John Randolph Neal Jr. (LL.B 1896) – attorney, best known for his role as chief counsel during the 1925 Scopes trial
- Neil Papiano (LL.B 1961) – lawyer, and managing partner of Iverson, Yoakum, Papiano & Hatch
- Michelle M. Pettit (J.D. 2001) – assistant U.S. attorney from California, National Security and Cybercrimes Section
- William Bradford Reynolds (LL.B 1967) – assistant attorney general in charge of the US Department of Justice's Civil Rights Division (1981–1988)
- Ronald J. Rychlak (J.D. 1983) – lawyer, jurist, and political commentator
- James Gordon Shanklin (B.A., LL.B 1935) – lawyer, key player in the investigation of the Kennedy assassination, co-implemented the FBI's National Crime Information Center
- Jack Thompson (J.D. 1976) – Vanderbilt Law School, disbarred attorney and activist against obscenity and violence in media and entertainment
- Horace Henry White (B.A. 1886, LL.B 1887) – lawyer, authored legal volumes White's Notarial Guide and White's Analytical Index
- Walton J. Wood – attorney and jurist who served as the first public defender in United States history (1914–1921)

==== Jurists ====
- Tamara W. Ashford (J.D. 1994) – Article I judge of the United States Tax Court
- Jennings Bailey (B.L. 1890) – district judge for the United States District Court for the District of Columbia
- Jeffrey S. Bivins (J.D. 1986) – chief justice of the Supreme Court of Tennessee
- Megan Benton (J.D. 2010) – district judge for the United States District Court for the Western District of Missouri
- Claria Horn Boom (J.D. 1994) – district judge of the United States District Court for Eastern and Western Kentucky
- John P. Bourcier (J.D. 1953) – justice of the Rhode Island Supreme Court
- John K. Bush (B.A. 1986) – U.S. circuit court judge, U.S. Court of Appeals for the 6th Circuit
- Charles Hardy Carr (B.A. 1925) – district judge for the United States District Court for the Southern District of California and Central California
- Albert M. Clark (LL.B 1900) – justice of the Supreme Court of Missouri
- Cornelia Clark (B.A. 1971) – justice of the Supreme Court of Tennessee
- Elijah Allen Cox (B.A. 1909) – district judge for the United States District Court for the Northern District of Mississippi
- Waverly D. Crenshaw Jr. (J.D. 1981) – chief district judge for the United States District Court for the Middle District of Tennessee
- Larry Creson (LL.B 1928) – justice of the Supreme Court of Tennessee
- Frank P. Culver Jr. (B.A. 1911) – justice of the Supreme Court of Texas
- Martha Craig Daughtrey (B.A. 1964) – senior United States circuit judge of the United States Court of Appeals for the Sixth Circuit
- Mary Dimke (J.D. 2002) – district judge for the United States District Court for the Eastern District of Washington
- Frank Drowota (B.A. 1960, J.D. 1965) – chief justice of the Supreme Court of Tennessee
- Eric Eisnaugle (J.D. 2003) – judge of the Florida Fifth District Court of Appeal
- Julia Smith Gibbons (B.A. 1972) – U.S. circuit judge of the United States Court of Appeals for the Sixth Circuit
- S. Price Gilbert (B.S. 1883) – justice of the Supreme Court of Georgia
- David J. Hale (B.A. 1982) – district judge for the United States District Court for the Western District of Kentucky
- William Joseph Haynes Jr. (J.D. 1973) – district judge for the United States District Court for the Middle District of Tennessee
- Thomas Aquinas Higgins (B.A. 1954, LL.B 1957) – district judge for the United States District Court for the Middle District of Tennessee
- John W. Holland (LL.B 1906) – district judge for the United States District Court for the Southern District of Florida
- Andrew O. Holmes (B.S. 1927, LL.B. 1929) – justice of the Tennessee Supreme Court
- Marcia Morales Howard (B.S. 1987) – district judge for the United States District Court for the Middle District of Florida
- Oscar Richard Hundley (LL.B 1877) – United States Federal Judge by recess appointment from President Theodore Roosevelt
- Albert C. Hunt (LL.B 1909) – justice of the Supreme Court of Oklahoma
- Edwin Hunt (B.A., J.D.) – appellate advocate, assistant attorney general, U.S. checkers champion (1934)
- Daniel E. Hydrick (B.A. 1882) – justice of the Supreme Court of South Carolina
- Alan Bond Johnson (B.A. 1961) – district judge for the United States District Court for the District of Wyoming
- William F. Jung (B.A. 1980) – district judge for the United States District Court for the Middle District of Florida
- Jeremy Kernodle (J.D. 2001) – district judge for the United States District Court for the Eastern District of Texas
- Megan McCarthy King (B.A. 1992) – judge of the Superior Court of Pennsylvania
- William C. Koch Jr. (J.D. 1972) – justice of the Supreme Court of Tennessee
- W. H. Kornegay (LL.B 1890) – justice of the Oklahoma Supreme Court, delegate to Oklahoma Constitutional Convention
- James C. Mahan (J.D. 1973) – senior district judge for the United States District Court for the District of Nevada
- Jon Phipps McCalla (J.D. 1974) – senior district judge for the United States District Court for the Western District of Tennessee
- Leon Clarence McCord (Law, 1900) – senior U.S. circuit judge of the United States Court of Appeals for the Fifth Circuit
- Travis Randall McDonough (J.D. 1997) – district judge for the United States District Court for the Eastern District of Tennessee
- Robert Malcolm McRae Jr. (B.A. 1943) – district judge for the United States District Court for the Western District of Tennessee
- James Clark McReynolds (B.A. 1882) – Supreme Court justice (1914–1941); 48th United States Attorney General (1903–1907)
- Gilbert S. Merritt Jr. (LL.B 1960) – senior United States circuit judge of the United States Court of Appeals for the Sixth Circuit
- Edward H. Meyers (B.A. 1995) – United States federal judge of the United States Court of Federal Claims
- Benjamin K. Miller (J.D. 1961) – chief justice of the Illinois Supreme Court
- Brian Stacy Miller (J.D. 1995) – district judge for the United States District Court for the Eastern District of Arkansas
- John Musmanno (J.D. 1966) – senior judge of the Pennsylvania Superior Court
- John Trice Nixon (LL.B 1960) – senior district judge for the United States District Court for the Middle District of Tennessee
- Tom Parker (J.D.) – chief justice of the Alabama Supreme Court
- Tommy Parker (J.D. 1989) – district judge for the United States District Court for the Western District of Tennessee
- Carolyn Miller Parr (M.A. 1960) – judge of the United States Tax Court (1985-2002)
- Marlin T. Phelps (J.D.) – chief justice of the Supreme Court of Arizona
- Thomas W. Phillips (J.D. 1969) – senior district judge for the United States District Court for the Eastern District of Tennessee
- Jonathan Pittman (J.D. 1990) – associate judge of the Superior Court of the District of Columbia
- Sam C. Pointer Jr. (A.B. 1955) – district judge for the for Northern Alabama, noted figure in complex multidistrict class-action litigation
- Eli J. Richardson (J.D. 1992) – district judge for the United States District Court for the Middle District of Tennessee
- Jay Richardson (B.S. 1999) – U.S. Circuit Court Judge, United States Court of Appeals for the 4th Circuit (2018–present)
- Kevin H. Sharp (J.D. 1993) – district judge for the United States District Court for the Middle District of Tennessee
- Eugene Edward Siler Jr. (B.A. 1958) – U.S. Circuit Court Judge, United States Court of Appeals for the 6th Circuit
- John F. Simms Sr. (J.D. 1906) – justice of the New Mexico Supreme Court
- Jane Branstetter Stranch (J.D. 1978) – Order of the Coif, United States circuit judge of the United States Court of Appeals for the Sixth Circuit
- Sarah Hicks Stewart (J.D. 1992) – justice of the Supreme Court of Alabama
- Aleta Arthur Trauger (M.A. 1972) – district judge for the United States District Court for the Middle District of Tennessee
- Emory Marvin Underwood (B.A. 1900) – senior district judge for the United States District Court for the Northern District of Georgia
- Thomas A. Varlan (J.D. 1981) – chief district judge for the United States District Court for the Eastern District of Tennessee
- Roger Vinson (J.D. 1971) – senior district judge for the United States District Court for the Northern District of Florida, former member of the United States Foreign Intelligence Surveillance Court
- Harry W. Wellford (LL.B 1950) – senior United States circuit judge of the United States Court of Appeals for the Sixth Circuit
- Samuel Cole Williams (LL.B 1884) – noted 19th- and 20th-century Tennessee jurist, historian, educator, and businessman
- Billy Roy Wilson (J.D. 1965) – senior district judge for the United States District Court for the Eastern District of Arkansas
- Thomas A. Wiseman Jr. (B.A. 1952, J.D. 1954) – senior district judge for the United States District Court for the Middle District of Tennessee
- Staci Michelle Yandle (J.D. 1987) – district judge for the United States District Court for the Southern District of Illinois

=== Military ===
- Spence M. Armstrong (transferred to Navy) – United States Air Force lieutenant general, Defense and Air Force Distinguished Service Medal, NASA Exceptional Service Medal recipient
- Archibald Vincent Arnold (M.A.) – United States Army major general, 7th Infantry Division during World War II, Army Distinguished Service Medal, former military governor of Korea
- Henry L. Brandon (J.D.) – United States naval aviator, Corsair Fighter-Bomber Squadron VBF-82
- Kendall L. Card (B.E. 1977) – United States Navy vice admiral, 64th director of Naval Intelligence, Defense Superior Service Medal recipient
- William Allen Darden Jr. – former colonel in the United States Army Corps of Engineers, Legion of Merit, Royal Order of George I
- Don Flickinger (M.D. 1934) – United States Air Force brigadier general, aerospace medicine pioneer; commander, Air Force Office of Scientific Research, Distinguished Service Medal
- Evelyn Greenblatt Howren – pioneering female aviator, first class of Women Airforce Service Pilots in World War II
- Tramm Hudson (B.A. 1975) – United States Army lieutenant colonel, 3rd Infantry Division
- Claiborne H. Kinnard Jr. (B.E. 1937) – United States Army Air Force decorated World War II fighter ace, 355th Fighter Group, Distinguished Service Cross
- William J. Livsey (M.S. 1964) – United States Army four-star general, commander in chief of United Nations Command, Defense and Army Distinguished Service Medal recipient
- John Mazach (B.A. 1966) – United States Navy vice admiral, commander of the Naval Air Force Atlantic
- Lee E. Payne (M.D. 1983) – United States Air Force, former command surgeon of the Air Mobility Command, Distinguished Service Medal
- Barbara S. Pope (B.A. 1972) – United States assistant secretary of the Navy
- William Estel Potts (B.A. 1958) – United States Army major general, Army Distinguished Service Medal, 22nd chief of Ordnance for the U.S. Army Ordnance Corps, U.S. Army Ordnance Corps Hall of Fame
- Jack Reed (B.A. 1947) – United States Army, Signal Intelligence Service during World War II
- William "Rip" Robertson – United States Marine Corps captain in the Pacific Theater, World War II, Paramilitary Operations officer for the CIA's Special Activities Division, CIA case officer
- Maritza Sáenz Ryan (J.D. 1988) – United States Army colonel, first female and Hispanic head of the department of law at the United States Military Academy
- Evander Shapard (LL.B 1917) – Royal Air Force World War I flying ace, 92 Squadron, six victories flying the S.E.5a, British Distinguished Flying Cross
- William Ruthven Smith – United States Army major general, Superintendent of the United States Military Academy, Distinguished Service Medal recipient
- Nora W. Tyson (B.A. 1979) – United States Navy vice admiral, Legion of Merit, first woman to lead a U.S. Navy ship fleet
- Volney F. Warner (M.A. 1959) – United States Army four-star general, commander-in-chief, United States Readiness Command (1979–1981), Defense Distinguished Service Medal recipient, coined the phrase "boots on the ground"

=== Ministry and religion ===
- Arto Antturi – Finnish Lutheran priest, vicar for the parish of Pitäjänmäki
- Robert Paul Boxie III (B.E. 2002) – Auxiliary Bishop of Washington of the Catholic Church, youngest Catholic bishop in the U.S.
- T. C. Chao (M.A. 1916, B.D. 1917) – one of the leading Christian theological thinkers in China in the early twentieth century
- James L. Crenshaw (Ph.D. 1964) – Robert L. Flowers Professor of the Old Testament at Duke University, leading scholar in Old Testament Wisdom literature, Guggenheim Fellow
- Jane Dixon (B.A., M.A.T.) – suffragan bishop of the Episcopal Diocese of Washington, second female bishop of the Episcopal Church
- Musa Dube (Ph.D. 1997) – Botswana feminist theologian, 2011 Humboldt Prize winner
- Robert W. Estill (D.Min. 1980) – 9th bishop of the Episcopal Diocese of North Carolina
- Mary McClintock Fulkerson (Ph.D 1986) – professor emerita of Theology at Duke Divinity School
- Robert W. Funk (Ph.D. 1953) – biblical scholar, founder of the Jesus Seminar and the nonprofit Westar Institute, Guggenheim Fellow, Fulbright Scholar
- William M. Greathouse – minister and emeritus general superintendent in the Church of the Nazarene
- William J. Hadden (M.Div. 1946) – Episcopal university chaplain, U.S. Army chaplain, U.S. Navy chaplain; desegregationist, World War II's V-12 Navy College Training Program at Vanderbilt
- Charles Robert Hager (M.D. 1894) – Swiss-American missionary, founder of the China Congregational Church in Hong Kong, baptized Sun Yat-sen, first president of the Republic of China
- John Wesley Hardt – bishop of the United Methodist Church, author, and biographer
- William S. Hatcher (B.A. 1957, M.A. 1958) – mathematician, philosopher; served on several National Spiritual Assemblies; wrote several books on the Baháʼí Faith after his 1957 conversion at Vanderbilt
- Susan Bunton Haynes (M.Div. 1993) – 11th bishop of the Episcopal Diocese of Southern Virginia
- William G. Johnsson (Ph.D.) – Seventh-day Adventist author, former editor of the Adventist Review
- Yung Suk Kim (Ph.D. 2006) – Korean-American biblical scholar and author, editor of the Journal of Bible and Human Transformation and the Journal of Race, Ethnicity, and Religion
- Walter Russell Lambuth (M.D. 1877) – recipient of theology and medical degrees from Vanderbilt; Methodist missionary to China, Japan and Africa; later bishop of the Methodist Episcopal Church, South
- John H. Leith (M.A. 1946) – Presbyterian theologian and ordained minister, authored at 18 books on Christianity
- Tat-Siong Benny Liew (M.A. 1994, Ph.D. 1997) – 1956 chair of New Testament studies at the College of the Holy Cross
- Robert McIntyre – Scottish-born American Bishop of the Methodist Episcopal Church
- Mark A. Noll (Ph.D. 1975) – progressive evangelical scholar, historian at the University of Notre Dame
- Carroll D. Osburn (D.Div. 1970) – scholar recognized as one of North America's leading New Testament textual critics and a prominent Christian egalitarian
- Mitch Pacwa SJ (Ph.D.) – bi-ritual American Jesuit priest celebrating liturgy in both the Roman and Maronite rites, president and founder of Ignatius Productions, accomplished linguist
- William Powlas Peery (M.A. 1959) – pastor of the Andhra Evangelical Lutheran Church in Andhra Pradesh, India, significant figure in South Indian Christianity in the 20th century
- David Penchansky (Ph.D. 1988) – scholar of the Hebrew Bible, literary critic to the Old Testament, particularly its Wisdom Literature
- Brant J. Pitre (M.T.S. 1999) – New Testament scholar, distinguished research professor of scripture at the Augustine Institute, Catholic transubstantiation theorist
- Clare Purcell (B.D. 1916) – Methodist bishop
- Sidney Sanders (B.A. 1952) – 6th Bishop of the Episcopal Diocese of East Carolina
- Laurel C. Schneider (Ph.D. 1997) – professor of religious studies, religion and culture at the Vanderbilt Divinity School
- Timothy F. Sedgwick (M.A., Ph.D.) – Episcopal ethicist; editor, Anglican Theological Review; president, board of directors, Society of Christian Ethics
- Ken Stone (M.A. 1992, Ph.D. 1995) – author, chairman of the Reading, Theory and the Bible Section of the Society of Biblical Literature, Lambda Literary Award winner
- Thomas B. Warren (M.A., Ph.D.) – restorationist philosopher and theologian
- B. Michael Watson (D.M) – bishop of the United Methodist Church
- Sharon D. Welch (Ph.D. 1982) – social ethicist and author; Affiliate Faculty, Meadville Lombard Theological School; former associate professor, Harvard Divinity School
- Walter Ziffer (B.E. 1954) – Czech-born Holocaust survivor, theologian, scholar, and author

=== Science, mathematics, and engineering ===
- Mary Jo Baedecker (B.S. 1964) – geochemist, established the Toxic Substances Hydrology Program at the United States Geological Survey, Department of the Interior Distinguished Service Award, Meinzer Award
- Edward Emerson Barnard (B.A. 1887) – astronomer who discovered Barnard's Star, Jupiter's fifth moon, nearly a dozen comets, and nebulous emissions in supernovae
- James L Barnard (Ph.D. 1971) – South African engineer, pioneer of biological nutrient remover, a non-chemical means of water treatment to remove nitrogen and phosphorus from used water
- Laura P. Bautz (B.S. 1961) – astronomer who created the Bautz–Morgan classification of galaxy clusters; professor, Northwestern University; director, astronomical science, National Science Foundation
- Bob Boniface (B.A. 1987) – automobile and industrial designer, director, Global Buick exterior design, director, Cadillac exterior design
- Sylvia Bozeman (M.S. 1970) – mathematician whose research on functional analysis and image processing has been funded by the Army Research Office, National Science Foundation, and NASA
- Kimberly Bryant (B.E. 1989) – biotechnologist for Genentech, Novartis Vaccines, Diagnostics, and Merck, founder of Black Girls Code
- Charles Richard Chappell (B.A. 1965) – NASA astronaut, former mission scientist for Spacelab 1, two-time NASA Exceptional Scientific Achievement Medal winner
- Yvonne Clark (M.S. 1972) – pioneer for African-American and women engineers, worked for NASA, Westinghouse, and Ford
- Baratunde A. Cola (B.E 2002, M.S. 2004) – scientist and engineer specializing in carbon nanotube technology, Alan T. Waterman Award winner
- Shirley Corriher (B.A. 1959) – biochemist and author
- William A. Davis Jr. (B.E. 1950) – engineer and distinguished leader in Ballistic Missile Defense (BMD) for the United States Army
- John H. DeWitt Jr. (B.E. 1928) – pioneer in radio broadcasting, radar astronomy and photometry, observed the first successful reception of radio echoes off the moon on January 10, 1946, as part of Project Diana
- Nathaniel Dean (Ph.D. 1987) – mathematician who has made contributions to abstract and algorithmic graph theory, as well as data visualization and parallel computing
- Harry George Drickamer – pioneer experimentalist in high-pressure studies of condensed matter, 1974 Irving Langmuir Award, 1989 National Medal of Science
- Lawrence C. Evans (B.A. 1971) – noted mathematician in the field of nonlinear partial differential equations, proved that solutions of concave, fully nonlinear, uniformly elliptic equations are $C^{2,\alpha}$, National Academy of Sciences
- Jordan French (B.E. 2007) – engineer and 3D food printing pioneer, founding CMO of BeeHex, Inc.
- Fumiko Futamura (Ph.D. 2007) – mathematician known for her work on the mathematics of perspective, 2018 Carl B. Allendoerfer Award
- Kenneth Galloway (B.A. 1962) – engineer researching solid-state devices, semiconductor technology, and radiation effects in electronics, IEEE fellow
- Mai Gehrke (postdoc) – Danish mathematician on the theory of lattices at the Centre national de la recherche scientifique
- Michael L. Gernhardt (B.S. 1978) – NASA astronaut and principal investigator of the Prebreathe Reduction Program at the Lyndon B. Johnson Space Center
- G. Scott Hubbard (B.S. 1970) – former director of NASA's Ames Research Center, chairman SpaceX Safety Advisory Panel, restructured the Mars program in the wake of mission failures
- Snehalata V. Huzurbazar (M.A. 1988) – statistician, known for her work in statistical genetics, and applications of statistics to geology, Elected Fellow of the American Statistical Association
- Jedidah Isler – astrophysicist, expert on blazars (supermassive black holes) and the astrophysical jet streams emanating from them
- Param Jaggi – inventor, invented Algae Mobile, a device that converts CO_{2} emitted from cars into oxygen, CEO of Hatch Technologies, founder and CEO of EcoViate, Forbes 30 Under 30
- Carl Jockusch (A&S 1959) – mathematician who proved (with Robert I. Soare) the low basis theorem, with applications to recursion theory and reverse mathematics
- Steven E. Jones (Ph.D. 1978) – physicist, known for his long research on muon-catalyzed fusion and geo-fusion
- John M. Jumper (B.S. 2007) – chemist and computer scientist, director at DeepMind Technologies, co-creator of AlphaFold, 2024 Nobel Prize in Chemistry
- Michael Kearney (M.E. 2002) – youngest person in world history to attain a college degree, having done so at the age of ten; studied computer science at Vanderbilt
- Betty Klepper (B.A. 1958) – USDA scientist at Rhizotron, co-authored more than 200 scientific publications; first female editor, Crop Science; first female fellow, SSSA; first female president, CSSA
- Karen Kohanowich (B.S. 1982) – Undersea Technology Officer for the Office of Ocean Exploration and Research at the National Oceanic and Atmospheric Administration, aquanaut on the NASA Extreme Environment Mission Operations
- Duncan Leitch (B.S. 2006, Ph.D. 2013) – neurobiologist who gained recognition for his work on the integumentary sensory organs in crocodilians
- William R. Lucas (M.S., Ph.D.) – 4th director of the NASA Marshall Space Flight Center
- Ashwin Mahesh (M.S. 1993) – Indian urbanist, journalist, politician and social technologist, climate scientist at NASA
- Dennis Mammana (M.S.) – astronomy writer and sky photographer
- Jennifer R. Mandel (Ph.D. 2008) – plant biologist researching plant population, quantitative genetics, evolutionary genetics, and phylogenetics
- James Cullen Martin (M.S. 1952) – chemist, responsible for the hexafluorocumyl alcohol derived "Martin" bidentate ligand and a tridentate analog, co-invented the Dess–Martin periodinane, creator of the Martin sulfurane
- Anne Matsuura (B.S.) – physicist, Director of Quantum Applications and Architecture at Intel Labs, Fulbright Scholar
- Emil Wolfgang Menzel Jr. (Ph.D. 1958) – primatologist whose research laid the foundation for the contemporary understanding of communication and cognition in chimpanzees
- Ronald E. Mickens (Ph.D. 1968) – physicist specialized in nonlinear dynamics and mathematical modeling with significant contributions to the theory of nonlinear oscillations and numerical analysis
- James O. Mills (B.A. 1984) – archaeologist known for his work in paleopathology, excavations at Nekhen (Hierakonpolis), the capital of Upper Egypt in the late 4th millennium BC, ancient Egypt's Protodynastic Period
- Stanford Moore (B.A. 1935) – protein chemist, inventor of a method for sequencing proteins, winner of the 1972 Nobel Prize in Chemistry
- Edward Craig Morris (B.A. 1961) – archaeologist whose Inca expeditions created a modern understanding of the Inca civilization, chair of department of anthropology at the American Museum of Natural History
- Thiago David Olson (B.E. 2011) – electrical engineer and entrepreneur who created a homemade nuclear fusion reactor at age 17, electrical engineer at the U.S. Department of Defense, co-founder and CEO of Stratos Technologies, Inc.
- Mendel L. Peterson (M.A. 1940) – pioneer of underwater archeology and former curator at the Smithsonian Institution, known as "the father of underwater archeology;" namesake of Peterson Island in Antarctica
- Dorothy J. Phillips (B.A. 1967) – pioneering African-American chemist known for work on circular dichroism and bioseparation, director-at-Large of the American Chemical Society
- Polly Phipps (M.A.) – social statistician, Senior Survey Methodologist at the US Bureau of Labor Statistics
- Philip Thomas Porter (B.A. 1952, M.A. 1953, Ph.D.) – electrical engineer and one of the guiding pioneers of the invention and development of early cellular telephone networks
- Joseph Melvin Reynolds (B.A. 1946) – physicist, first observation of Landau quantum oscillation in the Hall effect, first detection of LQO in Knight shift, NASA consultant, Guggenheim Fellow
- George G. Robertson – senior researcher, Visualization and Interaction Research Group, Microsoft Research
- Amy Rosemond (Ph.D. 1993) – aquatic ecosystem ecologist and biogeochemist who advanced the understanding of how nutrients affect energy flow in detritus-based food webs, Ecological Society of America fellow
- J. Robert Sims (B.S. 1963) – chemical, mechanical engineer, former research engineer at ExxonMobil, inventor, former president of the American Society of Mechanical Engineers
- Rebecca Sparling (B.A. 1930, M.S. 1931) – materials engineer, advanced the field of metallurgy, pioneered dye penetrant inspection for aerospace applications
- Ruth Stokes (M.A. 1923) – mathematician, cryptologist, and astronomer who made pioneering contributions to the theory of linear programming; founder of Pi Mu Epsilon
- John Ridley Stroop (B.S. 1924, M.A. 1925, Ph.D. 1933) – psychologist known for discovering the Stroop effect, a psychological process related to word recognition, color and interference
- James R. Thompson (B.S. 1960) – statistician known for biomathematically modeling HIV, AIDS, and cancer
- Bruce J. Tromberg (B.A. 1979) – photochemist and a leading researcher in the field of biophotonics
- Douglas Vakoch – astrobiologist, search for extraterrestrial intelligence (SETI) researcher, president of METI (Messaging Extraterrestrial Intelligence)
- Kalliat Valsaraj (Ph.D. 1983) – inventor, chemical engineer; chemical thermodynamics and kinetics in environmental engineering; National Academy of Inventors, Royal Society of Chemistry
- Davita Watkins (B.S. 2006) – chemist developing supramolecular synthesis methods to make new organic semiconducting materials for applications in optoelectronic devices
- Marsha Rhea Williams (Ph.D. 1982) – first African-American woman to earn a computer science Ph.D., National Science Foundation fellow

=== Medicine ===
- Alejandro Sánchez Alvarado (B.S. 1986) – Venezuelan molecular biologist and an investigator of the Howard Hughes Medical Institute
- Jean R. Anderson (M.D.) – internationally recognized obstetrician and gynaecologist, founder and first director of the Johns Hopkins Hospital HIV Women's Health Program (1991)
- Humphrey Bate (M.D. 1898) – physician and musician; surgeon in the Spanish–American War (1898)
- Eugene Lindsay Bishop (M.D. 1914) – director of health and safety, TVA, whose studies and control programs for malaria earned him a Lasker Award (1950)
- Daniel Blain (M.D. 1929) – first medical director of the American Psychiatric Association (APA)
- Ogden Bruton (M.D. 1933) – made significant advances in immunology, discovered Bruton-type agammaglobulinemia, namesake of Bruton's tyrosine kinase
- Thomas C. Butler (M.D. 1967) – scientist specializing in infectious diseases including cholera and bubonic plague, credited with making oral hydration the standard treatment for diarrhea
- David Charles (B.S. 1986, M.D. 1990) – neurologist, chief medical officer of the Vanderbilt Neuroscience Institute, director of telemedicine at Vanderbilt University Medical Center
- Alice Drew Chenoweth (M.D. 1932) – physician who specialized in pediatrics and public health, served as the chief of the Division of Health Services in the United States Children's Bureau
- Robert D. Collins (B.A. 1948, M.D. 1951) – physician and pathologist who established the Lukes–Collins scheme for pathologic classification of lymphoma
- Judith A. Cooper (M.S. 1972) – former director of the National Institute on Deafness and Other Communication Disorders
- Katherine Cullen (Ph.D. 1995) – biologist whose work provided direct evidence that the larger three-dimensional structure of the genome is related to its function
- Juliet Daniel (postdoc) – Canadian cancer biologist, discovered and named the protein ZBTB33 "Kaiso" at Vanderbilt in 1996
- William H. Dobelle – biomedical researcher and artificial vision pioneer, nominated for the Nobel Prize in Physiology or Medicine in 2003
- Allan L. Drash (B.A. 1953) – pediatric endocrinologist, former president of the American Diabetes Association, one of the original describers of the Denys–Drash syndrome
- Wilton R. Earle (Ph.D. 1928) – cell biologist known for his research in cell culture techniques and carcinogenesis
- Arnold Eskin (B.S) – leader in the discovery of mechanisms underlying entrainment of circadian clocks, developed the heuristic Eskinogram
- Francis M. Fesmire (M.D. 1985) – emergency physician and nationally recognized expert in myocardial infarction
- J. Donald M. Gass (B.A. 1950, M.D. 1957) – Canadian-American ophthalmologist, one of the world's leading specialists on diseases of the retina, first to describe many macular diseases
- Ernest William Goodpasture (B.A. 1908) – pathologist who invented methods for growing viruses and rickettsiae in fertilized chicken eggs, enabling the development of vaccination, described Goodpasture syndrome
- Barney S. Graham (Ph.D. 1991) – chief, Viral Pathogenesis Lab, Vaccine Research Center; co-designed spike protein with Moderna for the COVID-19 vaccine, Time 100 Most Influential People (2024)
- James Tayloe Gwathmey (M.D. 1899) – physician and pioneer of early anesthetic devices for medical use, "father of modern anesthesia"
- Tinsley R. Harrison – physician and creator and editor of the first five editions of internal medicine textbook Harrison's Principles of Internal Medicine
- Tina Hartert (M.D., M.P.H) – Lulu H. Owen Endowed Chair in Medicine, Vanderbilt University; leader, Human Epidemiology and Response to SARS (HEROS) study, National Institutes of Health
- Richard Hatchett (B.A. 1989, M.D. 1995) – CEO of Coalition for Epidemic Preparedness Innovations, Secretary of Health and Human Services Distinguished Service Award
- Dorothy E. Johnson (B.S. 1942) – nursing theorist, created the Behavioral System Model, a founder of modern system-based nursing theory
- Robb Krumlauf (B.E. 1970) – developmental biologist best known for his progression of the understanding of Hox genes
- Zenas Sanford Loftis (B.S. 1901) – physician, medical missionary to Tibet
- Louis Lowenstein (B.A., M.D.) – medical researcher who made significant contributions in hematology and immunology
- John Owsley Manier (B.A. 1907) – physician, accompanied the Vanderbilt hospital unit to Fort McPherson in 1917
- G. Patrick Maxwell (M.D.) – plastic surgeon, first successful microsurgical transfer of the latissimus muscle flap at Johns Hopkins University, advanced the design of tissue expanders
- Hugh Jackson Morgan (B.A. 1914) – former chair the department of medicine at Vanderbilt, former president of the American College of Physicians
- Harold L. Moses (M.D. 1962) – Ingram Professor of Cancer Research, professor of cancer biology, medicine and pathology, and director emeritus at the Vanderbilt-Ingram Cancer Center, president of the American Association for Cancer Research (1991)
- Sharlene Newman (B.E. 1993) – pioneered use of neuroimaging and functional magnetic resonance imaging to study language processing in the human brain
- George C. Nichopoulos (M.D. 1959) – physician best known as Elvis Presley's personal physician
- Jodi Nunnari (Ph.D.) – pioneer in mitochondrial biology; founding principal investigator, Altos Labs; editor-in-chief, The Journal of Cell Biology; former president, American Society for Cell Biology
- Lacy Overby (B.A. 1941, M.S. 1945, Ph.D. 1951) – virologist known for his contributions to Hepatitis B and Hepatitis C research
- William A. Pusey (B.A. 1885) – physician and past president of the American Medical Association, expert in the study of syphilis, authored the first history of dermatology in English
- Sanford Rosenthal (M.D. 1920) – pioneered liver function tests, discovered rongalite as the antidote for mercury poisoning, discovered an antibiotic cure for pneumococcal pneumonia, Public Health Service Meritorious Service Medal (1962)
- Samuel Santoro (M.D./Ph.D. 1979) – pioneering researcher in the structure of integrin adhesive receptors for extracellular matrix proteins, chair of the department of pathology, microbiology and immunology at Vanderbilt
- Robert Taylor Segraves (B.A. 1963, M.D. 1971) – psychiatrist best known for his work on sexual dysfunction and its pharmacologic causes and treatments
- Karen Seibert (Ph.D.) – pharmacological scientist, discoverer of celecoxib, instrumental in the elaboration of the COX-2 inflammatory pathway
- Norman Shumway (M.D. 1949) – 67th president of the American Association for Thoracic Surgery and the first to perform a successful heart transplant in the United States
- John Abner Snell (M.D. 1908) – missionary surgeon and hospital administrator in Suzhou (Soochow), China
- Sophie Spitz (M.D. 1932) – pathologist who published the first case series of a special form of benign melanocytic nevi that have come to be known as Spitz nevi
- Mildred T. Stahlman (B.A. 1943, M.D. 1946) – professor of pediatrics and pathology at Vanderbilt, started the first newborn intensive care unit in the world, winner of the John Howland Award
- Rachael Stolzenberg-Solomon (M.Ed. 1985) – head of metabolic epidemiology at the National Cancer Institute, associate professor at Yale University School of Public Health
- Ghanshyam Swarup – Indian molecular biologist known for his studies on glaucoma and the discovery of protein tyrosine phosphatase, Shanti Swaroop Bhatnagar laureate
- Carol Tamminga (M.D. 1971) – psychiatrist and neuroscientist focusing in schizophrenia, psychotic bipolar disorder, and schizoaffective disorder, National Academy of Medicine fellow
- Robert V. Tauxe (M.D.) – director of the Division of Foodborne, Waterborne and Environmental Diseases of the Centers for Disease Control and Prevention
- James C. Tsai (M.B.A. 1998) – president, New York Eye and Ear Infirmary of Mount Sinai, system chair of the Department of Ophthalmology at the Mount Sinai Health System
- Krystal Tsosie (MPH, Ph.D.) – geneticist and bioethicist known for promoting Indigenous data sovereignty and studying genetics within Indigenous communities
- Rhonda Voskuhl (M.D.) – physician and research scientist, Brain Research Institute (BRI) at the David Geffen School of Medicine at UCLA, principal investigator for treatment trials for multiple sclerosis (MS)
- Peter Walter (M.S. 1977) – German-American molecular biologist and biochemist known for work on unfolded protein response and the signal recognition particle, 2014 Lasker Award, 2018 Breakthrough Prize in Life Sciences winner
- Levi Watkins (M.D. 1970) – heart surgeon and civil rights activist; first to successfully implant an automatic defibrillator in a human patient with surgical technologist Vivien Thomas
- Logan Wright (Ph.D. 1964) – pediatric psychologist, former president of the American Psychological Association, coined the term "pediatric psychology"
- Li Yang (Ph.D.) – biologist, senior investigator and head of the tumor microenvironment section at the National Cancer Institute
- Lynn Zechiedrich (Ph.D. 1990) – biochemist, developed novel approaches to characterize the topography of DNA, National Academy of Inventors (2017)

== Notable faculty and staff ==
- Virginia Abernethy – professor emerita of psychiatry and anthropology; population expert; immigration reduction advocate
- Douglas Adams – distinguished professor of civil and environmental engineering
- Akram Aldroubi – professor of mathematics and Fellow of the American Mathematical Society
- Sidney Altman – Canadian-American molecular biologist, former researcher in molecular biology at Vanderbilt, 1989 Nobel Prize in Chemistry winner
- Igor Ansoff – Russian-American applied mathematician, known as the father of strategic management
- Celia Applegate – scholar, William R. Kenan, Jr. Professor of History, Affiliate Faculty of Musicology and Ethnomusicology
- Richard Arenstorf – mathematician, discovered a stable orbit between the Earth and the Moon (Arenstorf Orbit), which was the basis of the orbit used by the Apollo Program for going to the Moon
- Jeremy Atack – research professor emeritus of economics
- Nils Aall Barricelli – Norwegian-Italian mathematician whose early computer-assisted experiments in symbiogenesis and evolution are considered pioneering in artificial life research
- Larry Bartels – political scientist, co-director of the Center for the Study of Democratic Institutions and Shayne Chair in Public Policy and Social Science
- Eugene Biel-Bienne – Austrian painter, former faculty of the department of fine arts in the College of Arts and Science
- Camilla Benbow – dean of Peabody College at Vanderbilt University, scholar on education of gifted youth
- John Keith Benton (1896–1956) – dean of the Vanderbilt University Divinity School, 1939–1956
- Lauren Benton –, historian known for works on the history of empires, Nelson O. Tyrone, Jr. Professor of History and professor of law
- Michael Bess – Chancellor's Professor of History, professor of European studies
- David Blackbourn – British historian, Cornelius Vanderbilt Distinguished Chair of History
- Alfred Blalock – professor of surgery; in the 1930s did pioneering research on traumatic shock
- Paolo Boffetta – Italian epidemiologist
- John D. Boice Jr. – professor of medicine at Vanderbilt University School of Medicine whose discoveries "have been used to formulate public health measures to reduce population exposure to radiation and prevent radiation-associated diseases"
- Eric Bond –, economist, Joe L. Roby Professor of Economics
- William James Booth – professor of political science, professor of philosophy
- Constance Bumgarner Gee – art policy scholar, memoirist
- George Arthur Buttrick – Christian scholar
- Brandon R. Byrd – scholar of African American history
- William Caferro – Gertrude Conaway Vanderbilt Professor of History, 2010 John Simon Guggenheim Memorial Foundation fellow
- John Tyler Caldwell (1911–1991) – professor of political science at Vanderbilt University, 1939–1947; chancellor of North Carolina State University, 1959–1975
- Joy H. Calico – Cornelius Vanderbilt Professor of Musicology at the Blair School of Music, Berlin Prize Winner (2005)
- Kenneth C. Catania, neurobiologist – Stevenson Professor of Biological Sciences, MacArthur Fellow (2006)
- Jay Clayton – literary critic, William R. Kenan, Jr. Professor of English and director of the Curb Center for Art, Enterprise, and Public Policy
- Jeff Coffin – Grammy Award-winning saxophonist, member of Dave Matthews Band and Béla Fleck and the Flecktones, faculty of the Blair School of Music
- Stanley Cohen – biochemist, discoverer of cellular growth factors, winner of the 1986 Nobel Prize in Physiology or Medicine
- Alain Connes – mathematician, Fields Medal Winner (1982)
- James C. Conwell – mechanical engineer, president of Rose-Hulman Institute of Technology
- Bruce Cooil – Dean Samuel B. and Evelyn R. Richmond Professor of Management at Vanderbilt University in the Owen Graduate School of Management
- Tim Corbin – head coach, Vanderbilt Commodores Men's Baseball (2003–present), led Commodores to 2014 National Championship
- Margaret Cuninggim – dean of women, 1966–1973; namesake of the Margaret Cuninggim Women's Center on campus
- Walter Clyde Curry – academic, medievalist and poet, member of Fugitives, joined the English department in 1915, chair of the English department (1941–1955)
- J. Dewey Daane – economist and the Frank K. Houston Professor of Finance, emeritus and senior advisor, Financial Markets Research Center at Vanderbilt University, Board of Governors of the Federal Reserve
- Richard L. Daft – sociologist
- Larry Dalton – chemist best known for his work in polymeric nonlinear electro-optics; introduced the concept of "saturation transfer spectroscopy" while at Vanderbilt
- Kate Daniels – poet
- Donald Davie – British Movement poet and literary critic, author of Purity of Diction in English Verse, Vanderbilt professor (1978–1988)
- Colin Dayan – Robert Penn Warren Professor in the Humanities
- Max Delbrück – pioneering molecular biologist, winner of the 1969 Nobel Prize in Physiology or Medicine
- Arthur Demarest – Ingram Professor of Anthropology, Mesoamerican scholar
- Collins Denny (1854–1943) – professor of philosophy at Vanderbilt until 1911; taught John Crowe Ransom; tried to "impose theological control over the university" when he became bishop of the Methodist Episcopal Church, South
- Jacob M. Dickinson – professor of law 1897–1899 while he was an attorney for the Louisville and Nashville Railroad; United States Secretary of War, 1909–1911
- Tom Dillehay – anthropologist, Rebecca Webb Wilson University Distinguished Professor of Anthropology, Religion, and Culture
- Tony Earley – novelist
- Jesse Ehrenfeld – professor of anesthesiology, surgery, biomedical informatics, and health policy, chair-elect of the American Medical Association, leading researcher in the field of biomedical informatics
- Mark Ellingham – professor of mathematics, discoverer and namesake of the Ellingham–Horton graphs, two cubic 3-vertex-connected bipartite graphs that have no Hamiltonian cycle
- James W. Ely Jr. – Milton R. Underwood Professor of Law emeritus and professor of history emeritus, recipient of the Brigham–Kanner Property Rights Prize
- Leonard Feldman – physicist, named Fellow of the Institute of Electrical and Electronics Engineers (IEEE) in 2016 for contributions to semiconductor-dielectric interfaces for MOS technologies
- Charlotte Froese Fischer – chemist and mathematician responsible for the development of the multi-configurational self-consistent field of computational chemistry
- Edward F. Fischer – professor of anthropology
- Daniel M. Fleetwood – Olin H. Landreth Chair of the Electrical Engineering, co-invented a memory chip based on mobile protons, one of the top 250 most highly cited researchers in engineering, Chess Grandmaster
- Walter L. Fleming – historian of the South and Reconstruction, dean of the Vanderbilt College of Arts and Sciences in 1923 and later director of the graduate school, supporter of the Southern Agrarians
- Jim Foglesong – member of the Country Music Hall of Fame
- Hezekiah William Foote – co-founder and Vanderbilt trustee; Confederate veteran, attorney, planter and state politician from Mississippi; great-grandfather of Civil War author Shelby Foote
- Harold Ford Jr. – former U.S. congressman, candidate for Senate
- William Franke – academic and philosopher, professor of Comparative Literature
- Marilyn Friedman – philosopher, W. Alton Jones Chair of Philosophy
- Bill Frist – majority leader (2002–2007); U.S. Senate (1995–2007); former transplant surgeon
- F. Drew Gaffney – NASA astronaut, payload specialist for the STS-40 Space Life Sciences (SLS 1) Space Shuttle mission, professor of medicine
- Sidney Clarence Garrison (1885–1945) – 2nd president of Peabody College (now part of Vanderbilt University), 1938–1945
- Isabel Gauthier (Ph.D. 1998) – David K. Wilson Chair of Psychology, cognitive neuroscientist
- Nicholas Georgescu-Roegen – Romanian American mathematician, statistician and economist, distinguished professor of economics, emeritus (1949–1976), progenitor and a paradigm founder in economics, his work was seminal in establishing ecological economics
- Sam B. Girgus – author, film and literature scholar
- Ellen Goldring – education scholar
- Ernest William Goodpasture – pioneering virologist; invented the method of growing viruses in fertile chickens' eggs
- George J. Graham Jr. – political theorist who trained generations of political scientists at Vanderbilt, Fulbright scholar, Guggenheim Fellow
- Alexander Little Page Green – Methodist minister; a founder of Vanderbilt; his portrait hangs in the Board of Trust lounge of Kirkland Hall on the Vanderbilt campus
- Paul Greengard – visiting scholar, neuroscientist known for his work on molecular and cellular function of neurons, 2000 Nobel Prize for Physiology or Medicine
- F. Peter Guengerich – professor of biochemistry and the director of the Center in Molecular Toxicology, William C. Rose Award winner
- Peter Guralnick – music critic and historian; author; screenwriter
- Osamu Hayaishi – prominent Japanese biochemist, discovered oxygenases in 1955
- Carolyn Heinrich – economics professor and currently concurrently Sid Richardson Professor at University of Texas at Austin
- Suzana Herculano-Houzel – Brazilian neuroscientist working in comparative neuroanatomy; invented method of counting of neurons of the brain, discovered the relation between the cerebral cortex area and thickness and number of cortical folds
- Nicholas Hobbs – provost (1967–1975); former president of the American Psychological Association
- Elijah Embree Hoss – chair of ecclesiastical history, church polity and pastoral theology (1885–90); later a bishop of the Methodist Episcopal Church, South
- Milton W. Humphreys – Confederate sergeant during the Civil War, first professor of Latin and Greek at Vanderbilt, president of the American Philological Association (1882–1883)
- Dawn Iacobucci – quantitative psychologist and marketing researcher, professor in marketing at the Owen Graduate School of Management
- Bill Ivey – director of the National Endowment for the Arts during the Clinton administration; director of the Curb Center at Vanderbilt
- Kevin Jackson – British writer, broadcaster, filmmaker and pataphysician, former professor of English, regular BBC contributor, Fellow of the Royal Society of Arts, Companion of the Guild of St George
- Mark Jarman – poet and critic often identified with the New Narrative branch of New Formalism
- Carl H. Johnson – biologist, Stevenson Professor of Biological Sciences, professor of biological sciences, professor of molecular physiology and biophysics
- Sir Vaughan Jones – Stevenson Distinguished Professor of Mathematics, Fields Medal winner (1990)
- Bjarni Jónsson – Icelandic mathematician and logician, emeritus distinguished professor of mathematics, namesake of Jónsson algebras, ω-Jónsson functions, Jónsson cardinals, and Jónsson terms
- Edward Southey Joynes – first professor of modern languages at Vanderbilt
- Ann Kaiser – Susan Gray Chair in Education and Human Development Professor
- Peter Kolkay – associate professor of bassoon at the Blair School of Music, 2004 Avery Fisher Career Grant, First Prize at the Concert Artists Guild International Competition
- John Lachs – philosopher and pragmatist
- Paul C. H. Lim – Vanderbilt University Divinity School professor, scholar on Reformation and post-Reformation England
- Lee Ann Liska – president of Vanderbilt University Hospital (2023–present)
- David Lubinski – psychology professor known for his work in applied research, psychometrics, and individual differences
- Nathaniel Thomas Lupton – professor of chemistry at Vanderbilt (1875–1885)
- Horace Harmon Lurton – Associate Justice of the Supreme Court of the United States (1909–1914), former dean of Vanderbilt Law School
- Ian Macara – British-American biologist researching the molecules that establish Cell polarity in Epithelium, both in normal cells and in cancer, currently the Louise B. McGavock Chair at Vanderbilt
- Anita Mahadevan-Jansen – Orrin H. Ingram Chair in Biomedical Engineering
- Thomas H. Malone (1834–1906) – Confederate veteran; judge; dean of the Vanderbilt University Law School for two decades
- David Maraniss – biographer, columnist for the Washington Post; distinguished visiting professor of political science; his articles on President Bill Clinton won the Pulitzer Prize for National Reporting in 1993
- Jesse W. Markham – economist best known for his work on antitrust policy, price theory and industrial organization, former chief economist to the Federal Trade Commission, associate professor (1948–1952)
- Richard C. McCarty – professor of psychology and provost of Vanderbilt University
- Ralph McKenzie – mathematician, logician, and abstract algebraist
- Douglas G. McMahon – professor of biological sciences and pharmacology, known for discoveries in the fields of chronobiology and vision
- Timothy P. McNamara – Gertrude Conaway Vanderbilt Chair in the Social and Natural Sciences; professor, Department of Psychology
- Jon Meacham – visiting distinguished professor of political science, former executive vice president of Random House, and presidential biographer
- Michael Menaker – former chair of the Pharmacology Department, influential researcher on circadian rhythmicity of vertebrates
- Glenn Allan Millikan – former head of the department of physiology at the School of Medicine, introduced oximetry into physiology and clinical medicine, invented the first practical, portable pulse oximeter
- Jason H. Moore – translational bioinformatics scientist, founding director of the Advanced Computing Center for Research and Education at Vanderbilt (2000–2004)
- Lorrie Moore – fiction writer, Gertrude Conaway Vanderbilt Professor of English
- Gisela Mosig – German-American molecular biologist best known for her work with enterobacteria phage T4, among the first to recognize the importance of recombination intermediates in establishing new DNA replication forks
- Velma McBride Murry – psychologist and sociologist
- Roy Neel – campaign manager for Howard Dean; deputy chief of staff for Bill Clinton and chief of staff for Al Gore
- Herman Clarence Nixon – professor, member of the Southern Agrarians
- Thomas Nyfenger – principal flutist of the Mostly Mozart Festival Orchestra and the New York Chamber Symphony, former associate professor of flute at the Blair School of Music
- Kelly Oliver – philosopher specializing in feminism, political philosophy and ethics, W. Alton Jones Professor of Philosophy, founder of the feminist philosophy journal philoSOPHIA
- Aleksandr Olshansky – Soviet and Russian mathematician working in combinatorial and geometric group theory, professor of mathematics, Maltsev Prize laureate
- Frank Lawrence Owsley – American historian
- Thomas J. Palmeri (Ph.D. 1995) – Distinguished Professor of Psychology
- Sokrates Pantelides – university distinguished professor of physics and engineering, William and Nancy McMinn Professor of Physics
- Lyman Ray Patterson – influential copyright scholar and historian, former Vanderbilt University Law School professor, served as an assistant United States attorney while teaching at Vanderbilt
- Bruce Ryburn Payne (1874–1937) – founding president of Peabody College (now part of Vanderbilt University), 1911–1937
- Michael D. Plummer – retired professor of mathematics, known for his contributions to graph theory
- Ambra A. Pozzi – professor of nephrology working on matrix biology and matrix receptor biology
- Michael Alec Rose – composer, author, and professor of music composition at Vanderbilt's Blair School of Music
- Edward B. Saff – mathematician, specializing in complex analysis, approximation theory, numerical analysis, and potential theory, Guggenheim Fellow
- Herbert Charles Sanborn (1873–1967) – chair of the department of philosophy and psychology at Vanderbilt University 1921–1942
- Samuel Santoro – Dorothy B. and Theodore R. Austin Professor and chair at Vanderbilt University, microbiologist and immunologist researching structure and biology of integrin adhesive receptors for extracellular matrix proteins
- Mark Sapir – Russian-American mathematician working in geometric group theory, semigroup theory and combinatorial algebra, Centennial Professor of Mathematics
- Charles Madison Sarratt (1888–1978) – chair of the department of mathematics at Vanderbilt University, 1924–1946; dean of students, 1939–1945; vice-chancellor, 1946–1958; dean of alumni, 1958–1978
- Douglas C. Schmidt, computer scientist
- Ronald D. Schrimpf, electrical engineer and scientist, Orrin H. Ingram Chair in Engineering, Electrical Engineering & Computer Science, director of the Institute for Space and Defense Electronics at Vanderbilt
- Thomas Alan Schwartz – historian of American foreign relations, former president of the Society for Historians of American Foreign Relations
- Julia Sears – mathematician, pioneering feminist
- Margaret Rhea Seddon – astronaut
- Choon-Leong Seow – Singaporean biblical scholar, semitist, epigrapher, and historian of Near Eastern religion, currently as Vanderbilt, Buffington, Cupples Chair in Divinity and distinguished professor of Hebrew Bible
- Carl Keenan Seyfert – astronomer, known for research on high-excitation line emission from the centers of some spiral galaxies named Seyfert galaxies, first director of Vanderbilt's Dyer Observatory
- Albert Micajah Shipp – professor of exegetical theology at Vanderbilt University in 1875; dean of the Divinity School, 1882–1887
- Steve Simpson – research professor of mathematics, known for reverse mathematics
- Ganesh Sitaraman – legal scholar, professor of law, adviser to Elizabeth Warren, senior fellow of the Center for American Progress
- Francis G. Slack – professor of physics and head of the department of physics (appointed 1939), instrumental in the discovery of nuclear fission
- William Oscar Smith – jazz double bassist; founder of the W.O. Smith Music School in Nashville; former professor at Vanderbilt's Blair School of Music
- Larry Soderquist – professor of law at Vanderbilt University Law School (1981–2005), director at Corporate and Securities Law Institute
- Ronald Spores – archaeologist, ethnohistorian and Mesoamerican scholar
- Hans Stoll – his research revolutionized the field of financial derivatives and market microstructure
- Hans Herrman Strupp (1921–2006) – Distinguished Professor of Psychology
- Thomas Osgood Summers – Methodist theologian; dean of the Biblical Department at Vanderbilt in 1878
- Earl Sutherland – physiologist; discoverer of hormonal second messengers; winner of the 1971 Nobel Prize in Physiology or Medicine
- Carol Miller Swain – professor of Political Science and Law
- Kent Syverud – former Garner Anthony Professor of Law at the Vanderbilt University Law School, expert on complex litigation, insurance law, and civil procedure
- Janos Sztipanovits – computer scientist, led the research group that created a novel area in computer engineering called Model Integrated Computing (MIC)
- Robert B. Talisse – philosopher and political theorist, former editor of Public Affairs Quarterly
- Dean S. Tarbell – former distinguished professor of chemistry known for his development of detection methods of chemical warfare agents during World War II, and his discovery of mixed carboxylic-carbonic anhydrides
- Vivian Thomas – surgical technician working with Alfred Blalock; developed techniques that enabled key advances in the treatment of traumatic shock
- Wilbur Fisk Tillett (1854–1936) – professor of theology, dean of the Theological Faculty after 1884 and vice-chancellor after 1886
- Norman Tolk – physicist
- Jada Benn Torres – Associate Professor of Anthropology and Director of the Laboratory of Genetic Anthropology and Biocultural Studies
- Barbara Tsakirgis – classical archaeologist with specialization in Greek and Roman archaeology
- Kalman Varga – Hungarian-American physicist, Fellow of the American Physical Society
- William J. Vaughn (1834–1912) – professor of mathematics; librarian
- Jerzy Vetulani – Polish neuroscientist, pharmacologist and biochemist, former research professor, discovered β-downregulation by chronic administration of antidepressants
- W. Kip Viscusi – economist, university distinguished professor of law, economics, and management at Vanderbilt University Law School
- John Donald Wade – member of English faculty, contributed to Southern Agrarian manifesto I'll Take My Stand
- Taylor Wang – first Taiwanese person of Han Chinese ancestry to go into space, employee of the Jet Propulsion Laboratory, payload specialist on the Space Shuttle Challenger mission STS-51-B
- John Wikswo – biological physicist, Gordon A. Cain University Professor, professor of biomedical engineering, professor of molecular physiology and biophysics, director, Vanderbilt Institute for Integrative Biosystems Research and Education, A.B. Learned Professor in Living State Physics
- Consuelo H. Wilkins – physician, researcher, academic and administrator, Vanderbilt University School of Medicine
- Arthur Frank Witulski – research associate professor electrical engineering and computer science, engineer at the Institute for Space and Defense Electronics at Vanderbilt
- David Wood – British philosopher
- Daoxing Xia – Chinese American mathematician, currently a professor in the department of mathematics, elected an academician of the Chinese Academy of Sciences in 1980
- Christopher Yoo – professor at Vanderbilt University Law School (1999–2007), former director of Vanderbilt's Technology and Entertainment Law Program, among the most frequently cited scholars of technology law, media law and copyright
- Guoliang Yu – Chinese American mathematician best known for his fundamental contributions to the Novikov conjecture on homotopy invariants of higher signatures, professor of mathematics (2000–2012)
- Serge Aleksandrovich Zenkovsky – Russian historian, specialized in economic history in Eastern Europe and Central Asia, Guggenheim Fellow
- Mel Ziegler – artist specialized in community art, integrated arts, public art, current chair of the Department of Art
- Annet Kirabo - researcher studying hypertension and oxidative stress, is currently an associate professor of medicine and of molecular physiology & biophysics

== Gallery of Vanderbilt notables ==
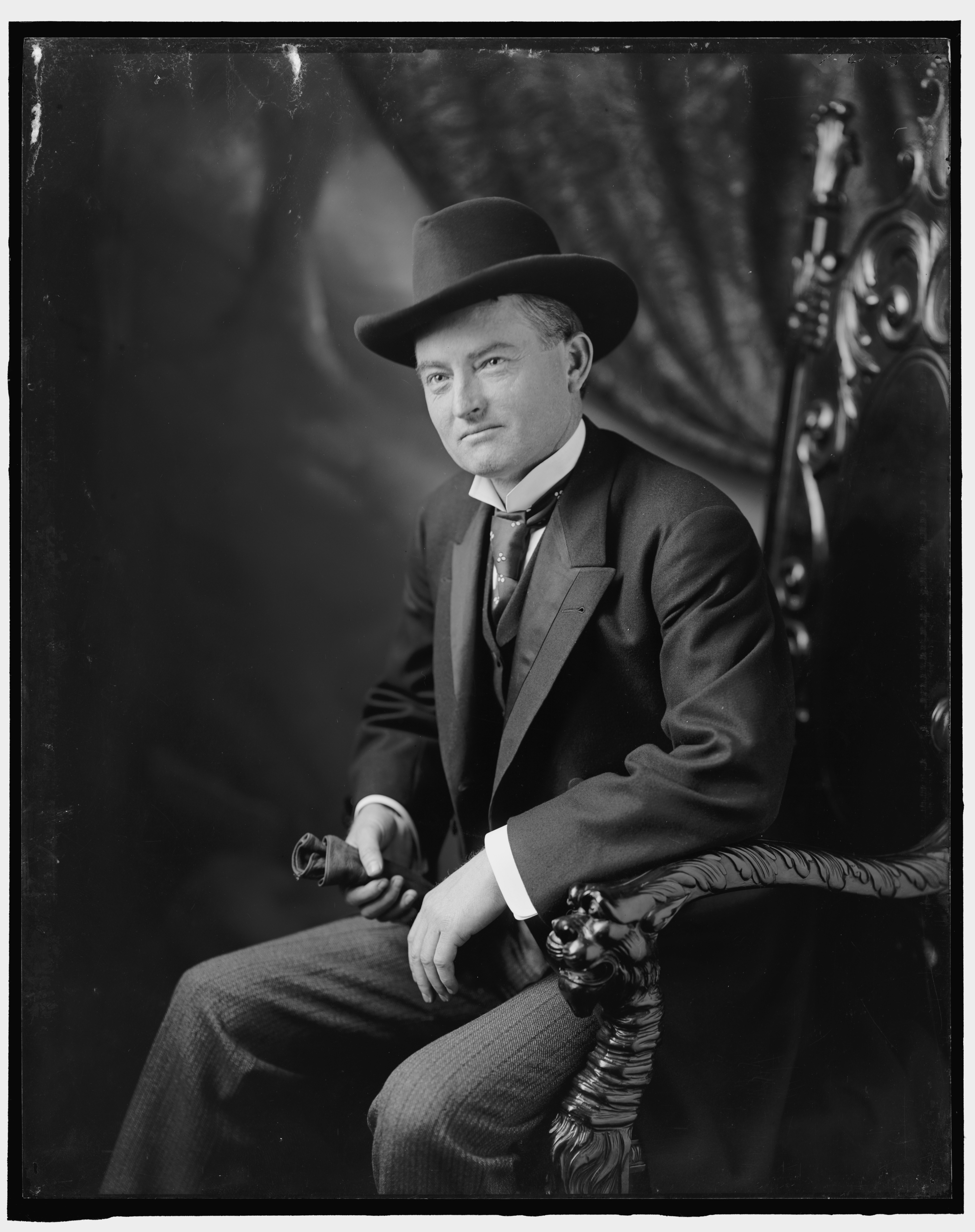
U.S. Vice President John Nance Garner

U.S. Vice President Al Gore

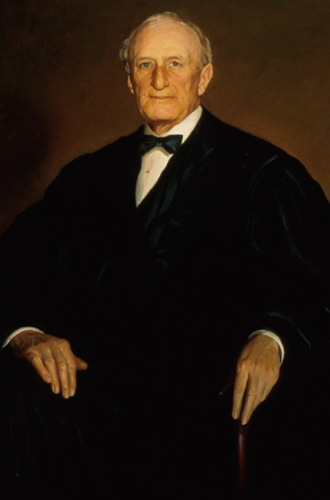
U.S. Supreme Court Justice James Clark McReynolds

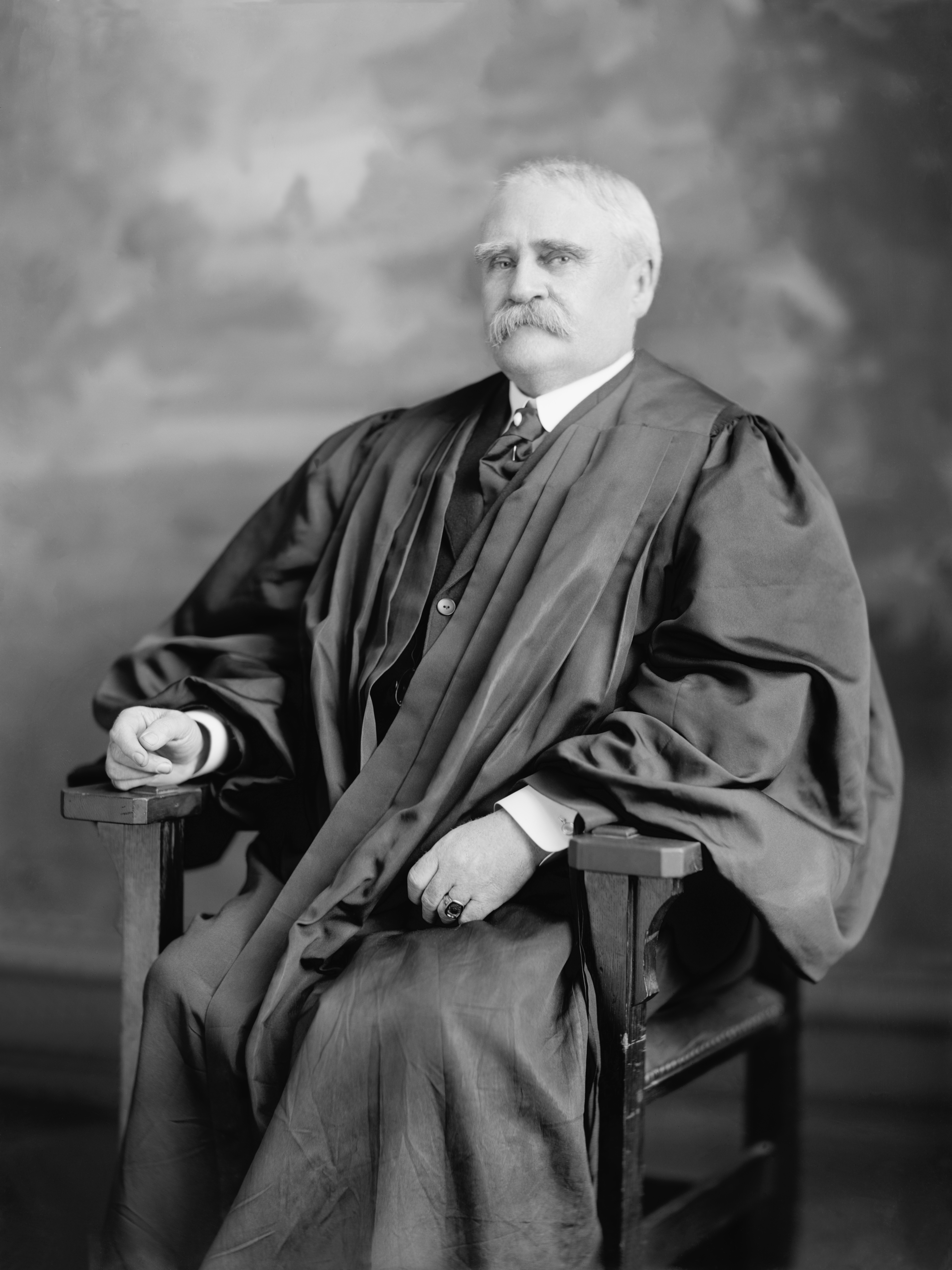
U.S. Supreme Court Justice Horace Harmon Lurton

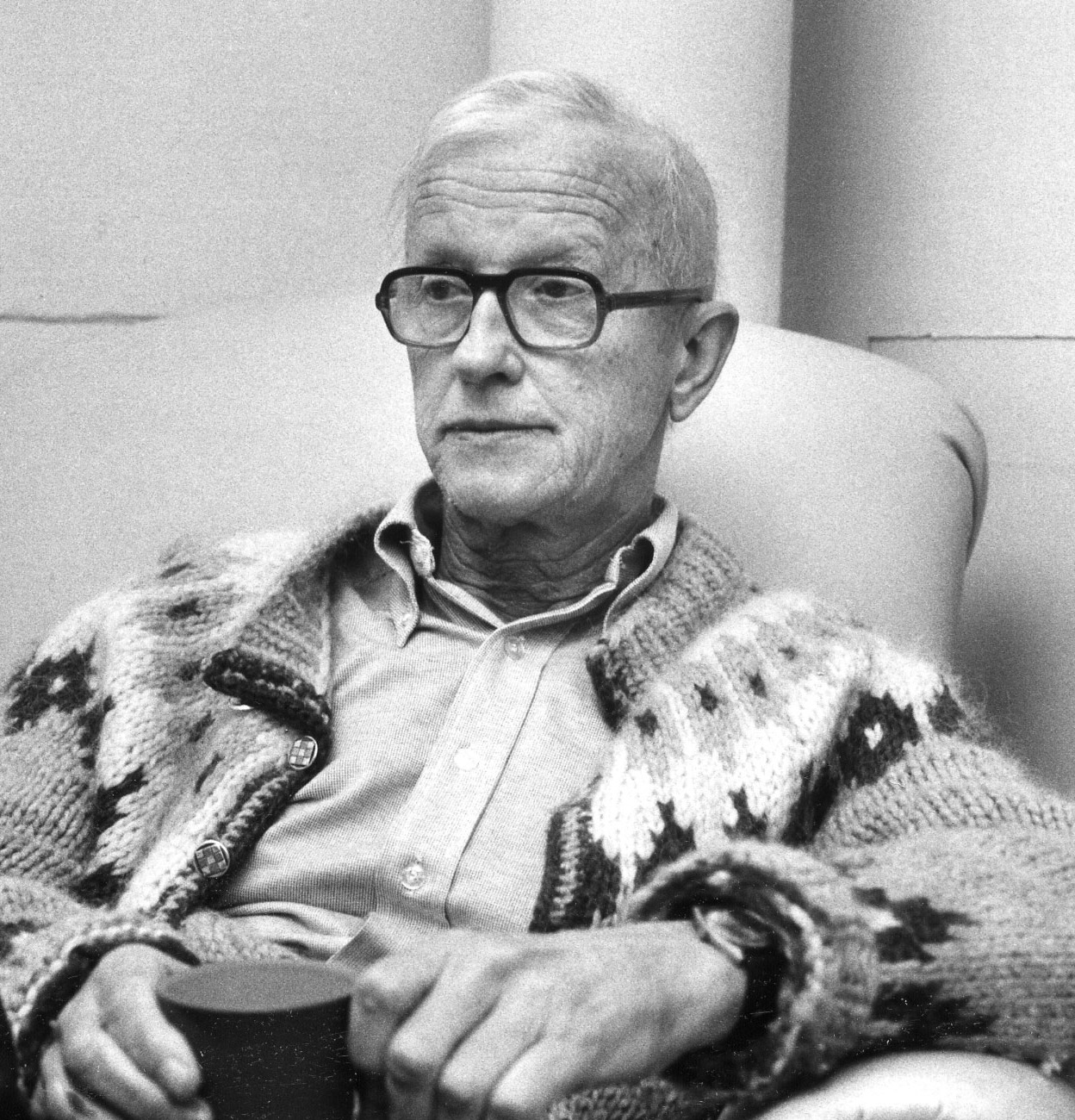
Nobel laureate Max Delbrück

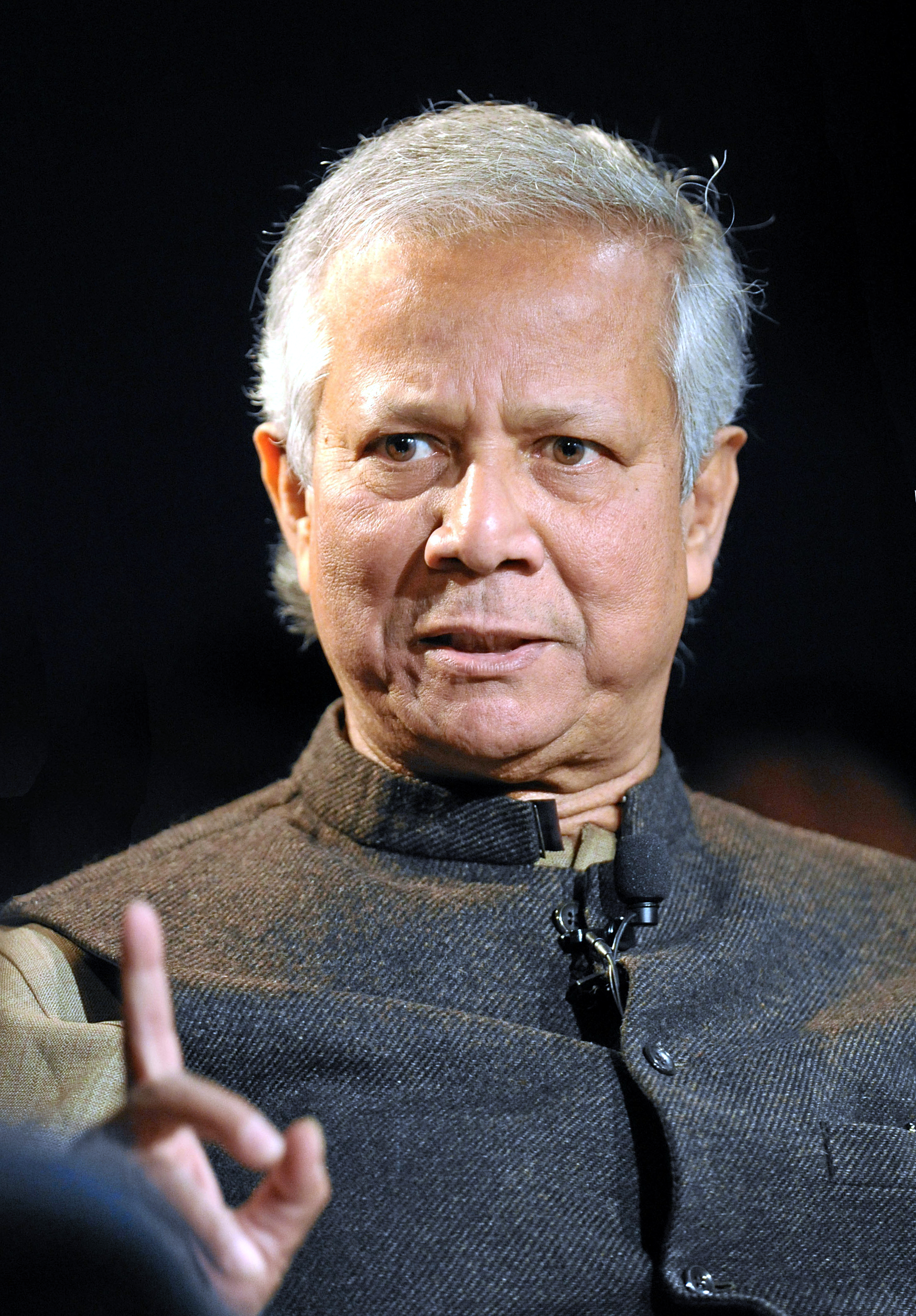
Nobel laureate Muhammad Yunus

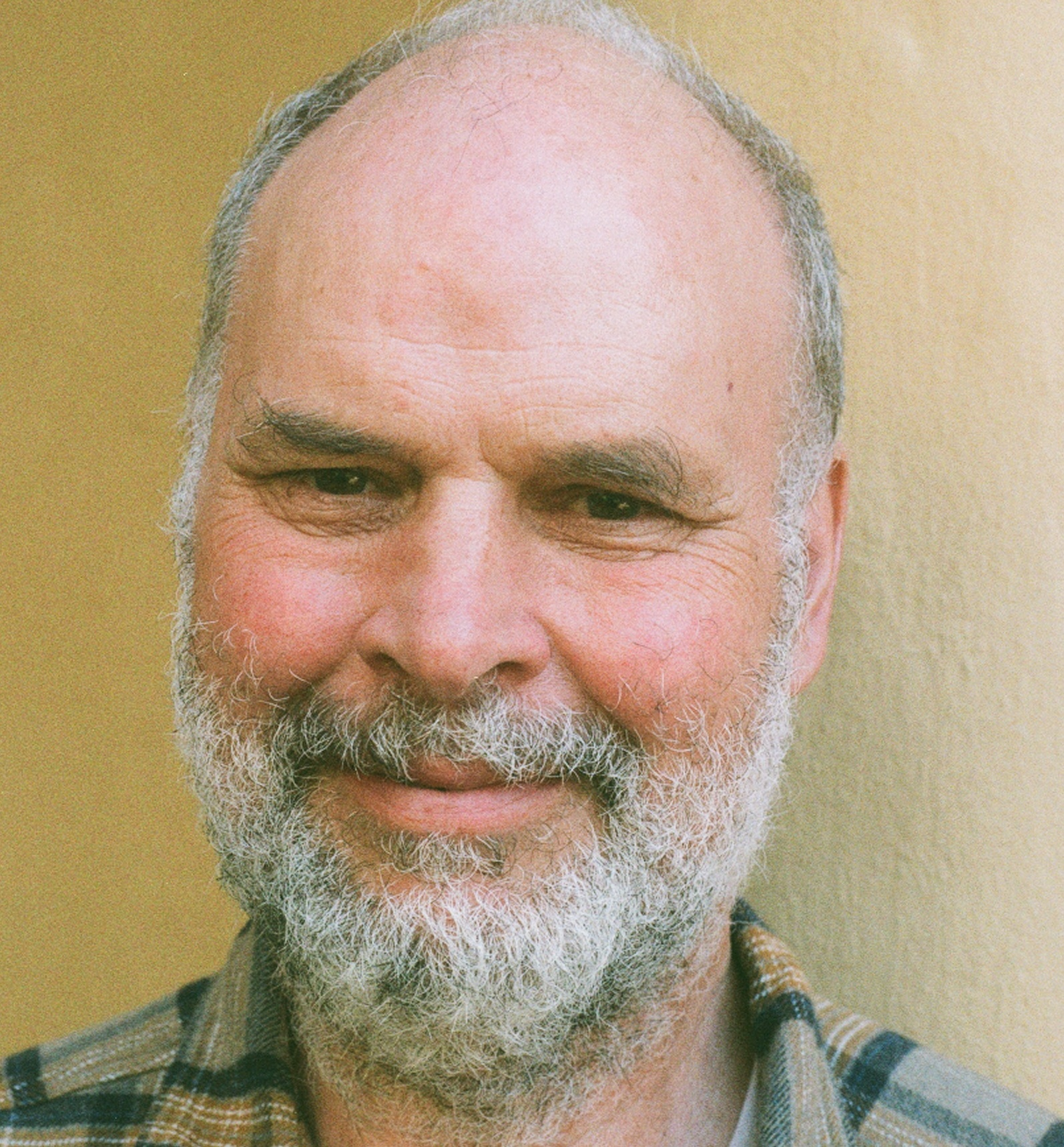
Fields Medalist Sir Vaughan Jones

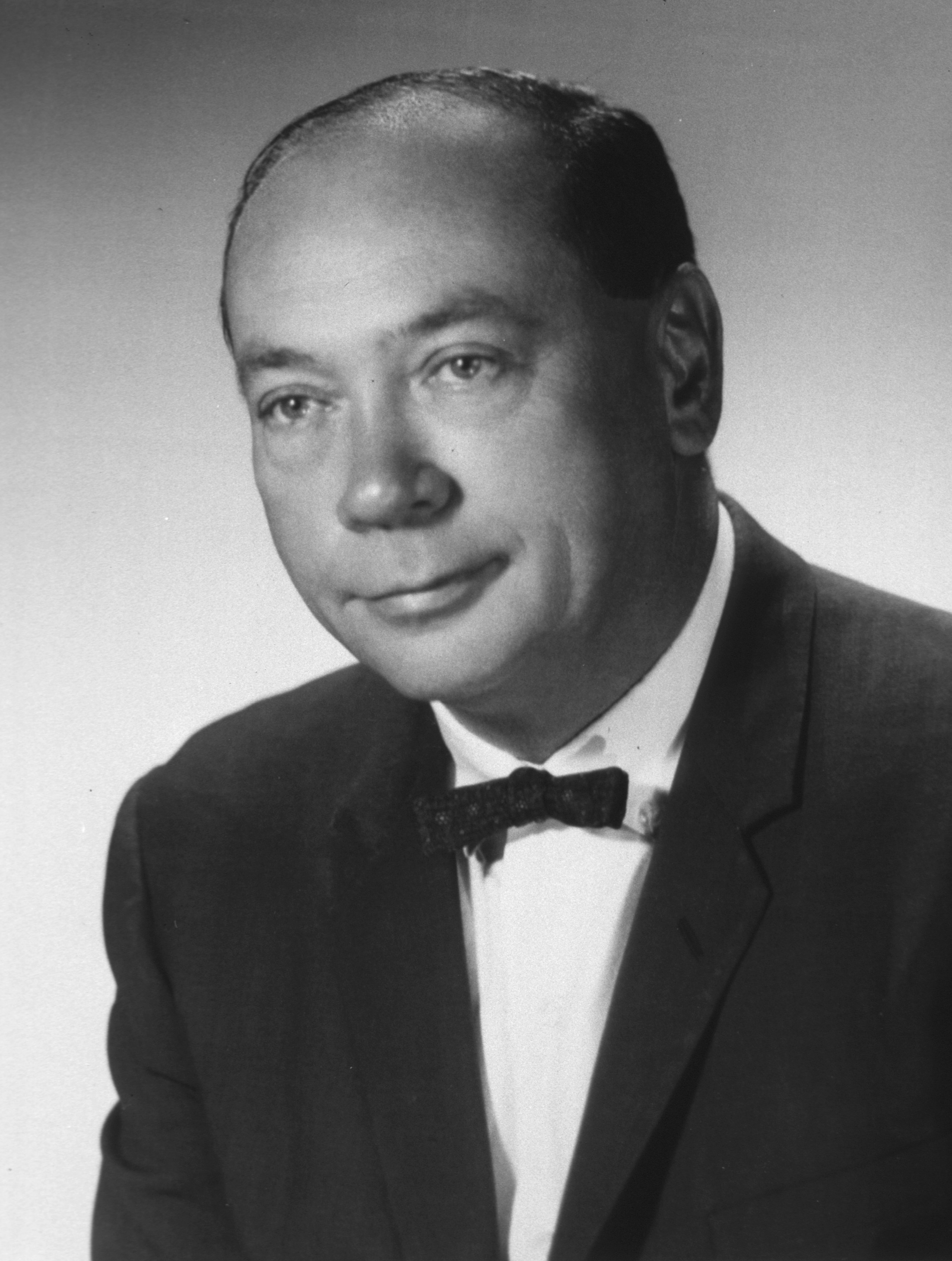
Nobel laureate Earl Sutherland

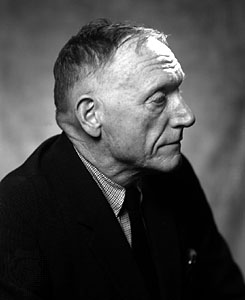
Pulitzer Prize winner Robert Penn Warren

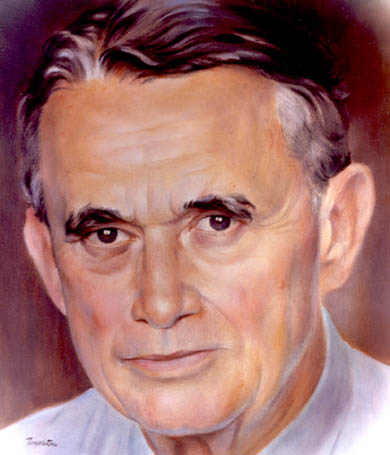
Pulitzer Prize winner Ralph McGill

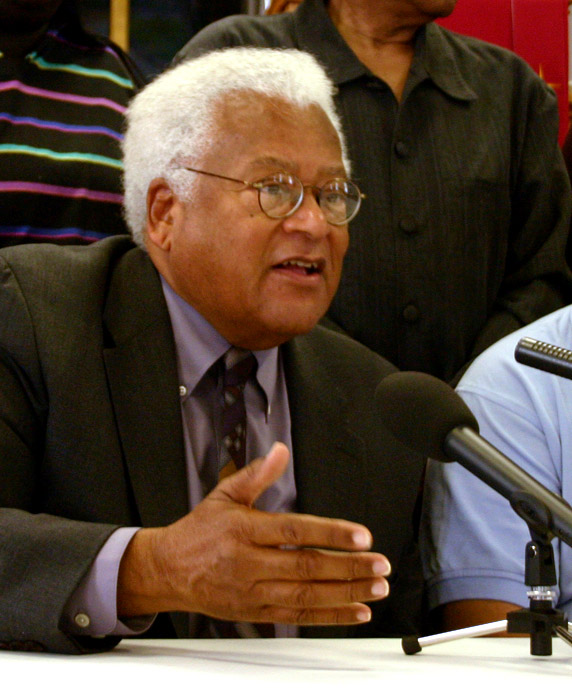
Civil rights movement pioneer James Lawson

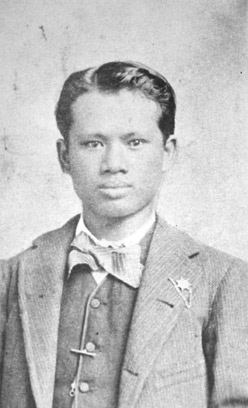
Businessman and Xinhai revolutionary Charlie Soong

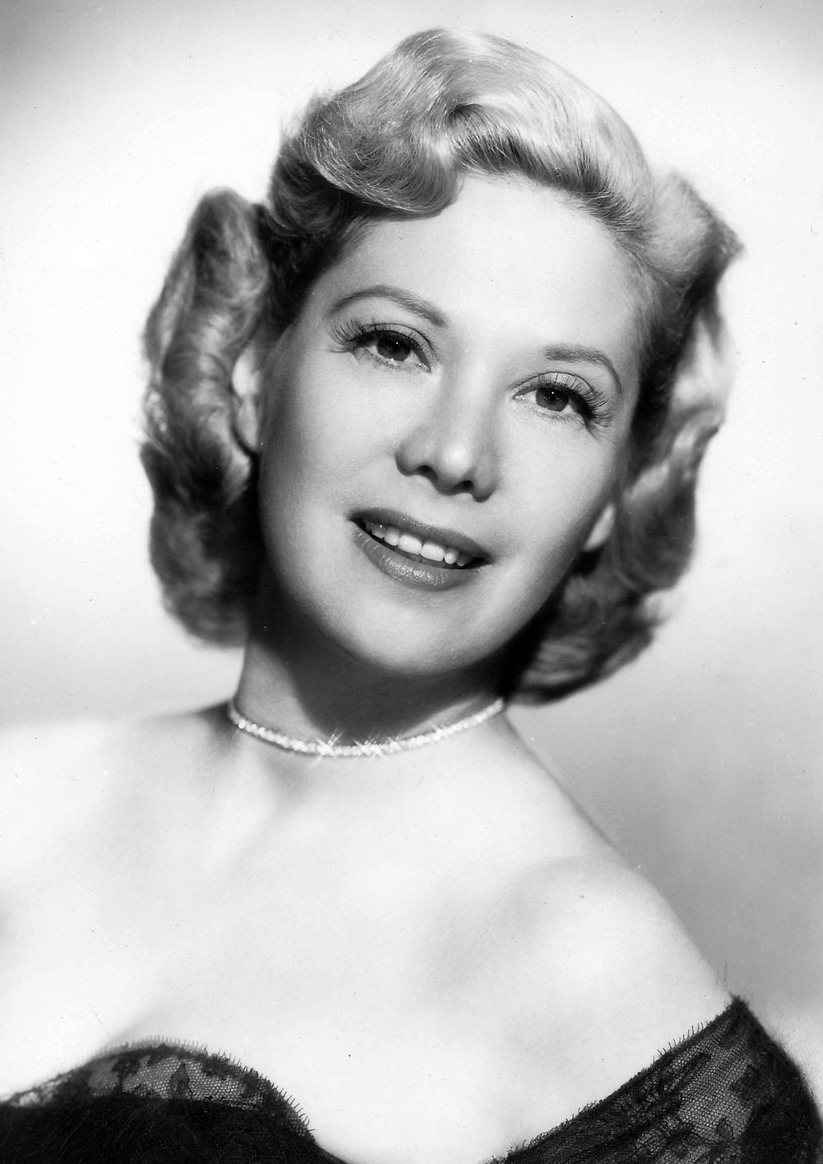
American pop culture icon Dinah Shore

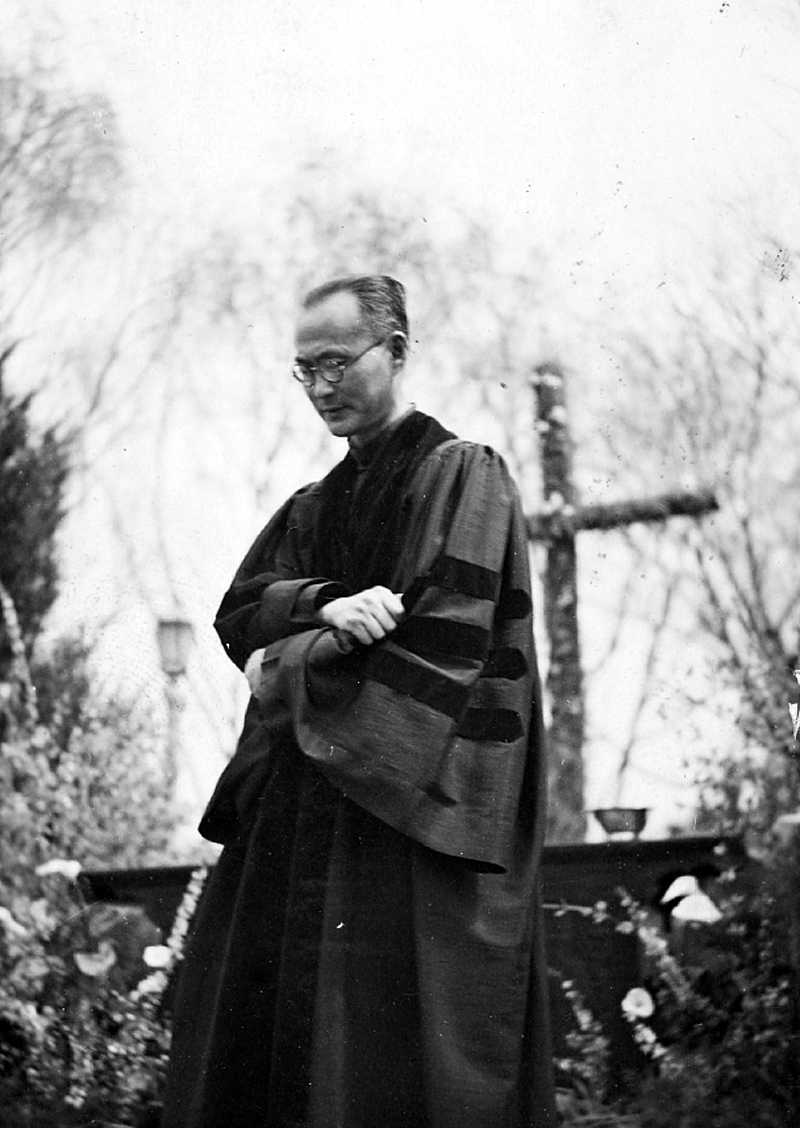
Chinese theologian T. C. Chao
