= Owen Graduate School of Management =

Business school at Vanderbilt University

Coordinates: 36.1472795°N 86.7999992°W

- Type: Private
- Established: 1969
- Accreditation: AACSB International
- Endowment: $450 million
- Dean: Thomas J. Steenburgh
- Location: Nashville, Tennessee, US
- Campus: Urban, 330 acres
- Website: business.vanderbilt.edu

The Vanderbilt University Owen Graduate School of Management (Vanderbilt Business School or Vanderbilt Business) is the graduate business school of Vanderbilt University in Nashville, Tennessee, United States. Founded in 1969, Owen offers eight degree programs: a standard 2-year Master of Business Administration (MBA), Executive MBA, Master of Science in Finance, Master of Accountancy (Assurance and Valuation tracks), Master of Marketing, Master of Management, Master of Management in Health Care, and Master of Science in Business and Technology, as well as a variety of joint and dual degree programs. Owen also offers non-degree programs for undergraduates and professionals.

The student to faculty ratio is about 7 to 1, with over 600 students and over 50 full-time faculty members.

The school is named for Ralph “Peck” Owen and his wife, Lulu Hampton Owen. Ralph Owen, a Vanderbilt alumnus (’28), was a founder of Equitable Securities Corporation in Nashville, and he became the chairman of the American Express Company.

== History ==
In 1881, Vanderbilt's Board of Trust submitted its first proposal for a business education program, calling it the Commercial College Department. However, it wasn't until the mid-1950s that a business administration program was offered in the Department of Economics.

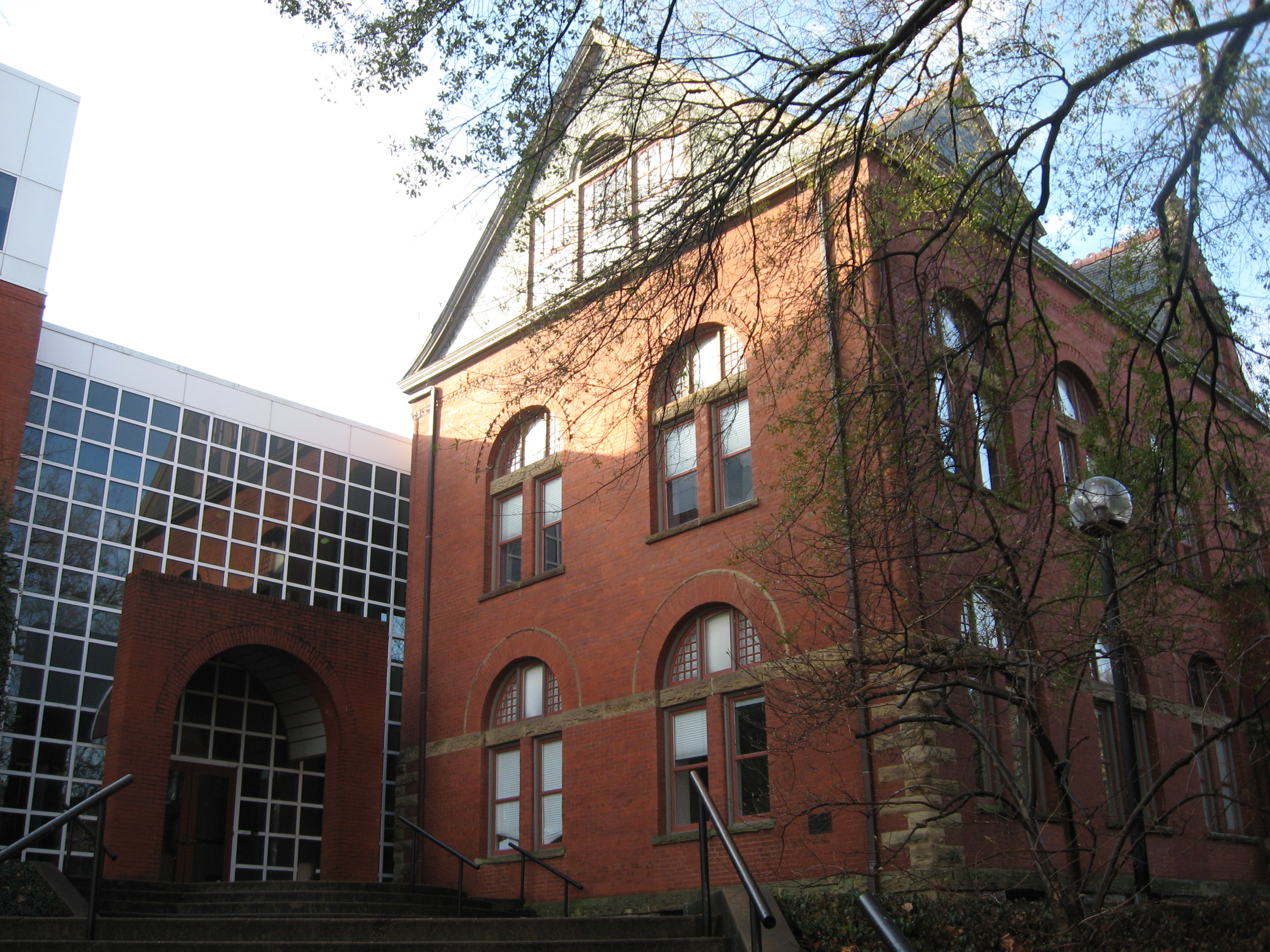
Exterior of Owen Graduate School

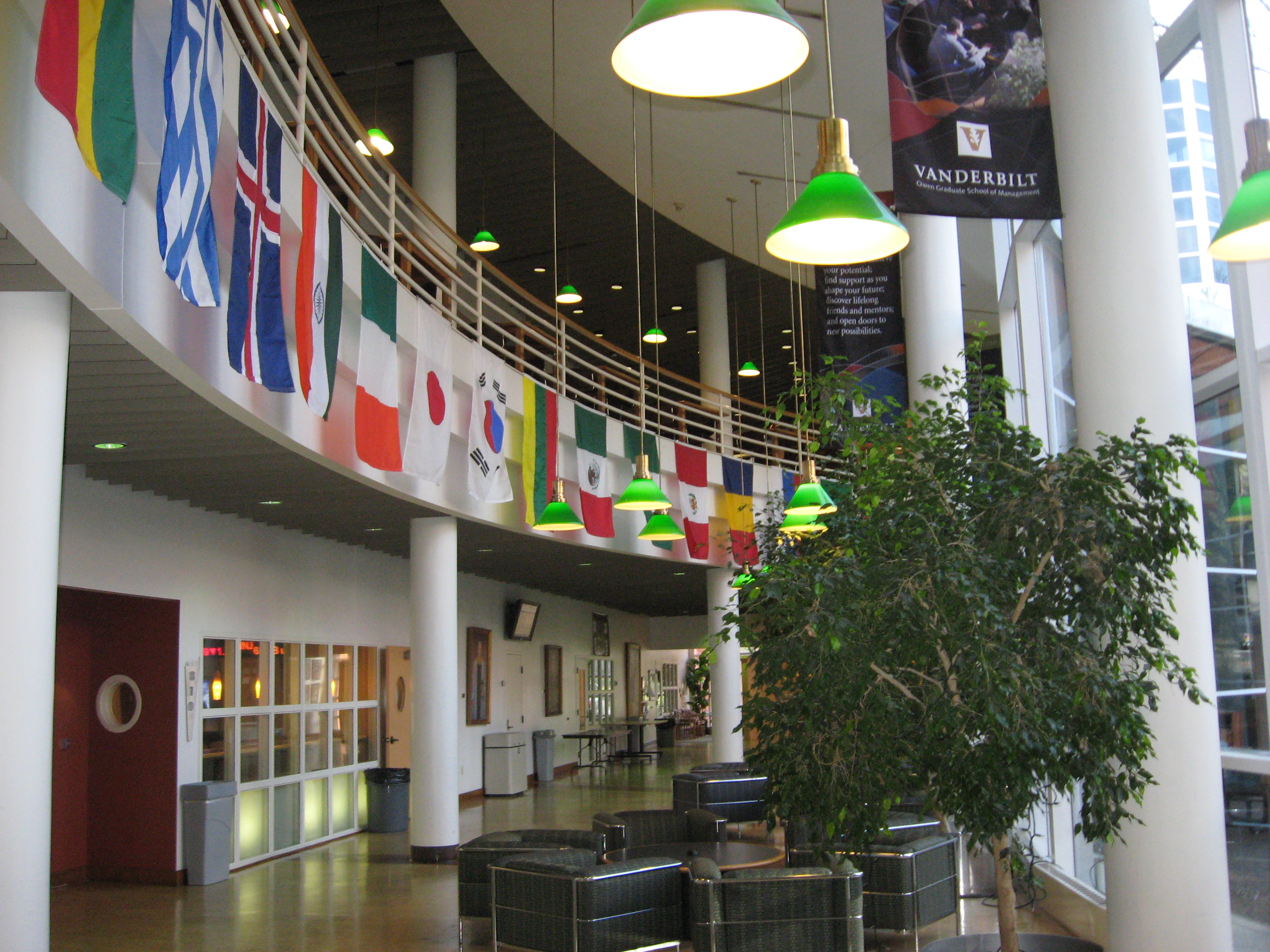
Interior of Owen Graduate School

The Board of Trust passed the school's founding resolution on May 5, 1967, and operations as the Graduate School of Management began in September 1969 with twelve faculty members and six students. Classes met in a renovated funeral home, a gift from Mr. and Mrs. David K. Wilson. The building was named Alexander Hall in honor of Henry Clay Alexander, a Vanderbilt alum and president of J.P. Morgan.

It was under Dean Samuel B. Richmond, that the school was named for Ralph and Lulu Owen. Following the deaths of both Mr. and Mrs. Owen, their estates gave $33.5 million to The Owen School, said to be the largest gift to a U.S. business school at that time. That sum raised the total of their gifts to more than $62 million.

The Owen School moved from Alexander Hall to Management Hall in 1982. Management Hall is connected to Mechanical Engineering Hall, which is home to the Executive MBA program. Management Hall also houses the Walker Library collection of more than 50,000 volumes, more than 900 periodical titles, reference works, and electronic databases. The library was named in honor of Anne Marie and Thomas B. Walker, Jr.

At present, about 25% of the student body are international students, and 33% are women. Finance was the most popular area for Vanderbilt MBA students in 2007–8; 43 percent accepted jobs in that field. Eight percent of faculty members have owned a business.

In July 2023, Thomas Steenburgh became the Ralph Owen Dean and Professor of Marketing. He began his academic career at Harvard Business School.

== Programs ==
The Owen Graduate School of Management is accredited by the AACSB International (The Association to Advance Collegiate Schools of Business) and is a full member of the Executive MBA Council (EMBAC).

- Master of Business Administration (MBA): The Vanderbilt MBA degree program takes two years to complete. The health care concentration was introduced in 2005.
- Executive MBA (EMBA): Students who pursue the Executive MBA have prior work experience; all candidates must have at least five years of work experience in their fields. The program requires 21 months. The first EMBA class graduated in the spring of 1980.
- Master of Science in Finance (MSF)
- Master of Accountancy (MAcc) with two specialization options: Assurance and Valuation
- Master of Marketing
- Master of Management
- Master of Management in Health Care (MMHC): A one-year degree aimed at clinicians and non-clinicians; all candidates must have at least five years of work experience in their fields.
- Master of Science in Business and Technology (MSBT)
- Accelerator Summer Business Immersion: A three-week program where students in teams take classes and serve as consultants for real businesses.
- Hoogland Undergraduate Business Program (Minor)
- Executive Education: The Owen School offers several non-degree programs for working professionals that cover topics such as management fundamentals, leadership, health care, and banking Courses are typically 2-3 days and completing several may earn a certificate.

== Rankings and recognition ==
In 2026, Owen was ranked #16 in U.S. News & World Report's business schools rankings.

Bloomberg Businessweek ranked the full-time MBA program #27 for 2025 - 2026. In 2026, the full-time MBA program was ranked #51 in the Financial Times global MBA rankings.

The Owen School was one of two winners of the 2008 TeamMBA Award, which was presented by the Graduate Management Admission Council (GMAC).

Bruce Cooil, Dean Samuel B. and Evelyn R. Richmond Professor of Management, was awarded the 2007 Marketing Science Institute/H. Paul Root Award. Michael A. Lapré, E. Bronson Ingram Professor in Operations Management, has received the Shingo Research Prize. Professor Nancy Hyer and Urban Wemmerlov's book Reorganizing the Factory: Competing through Cellular Manufacturing, won the 2003 Shingo Prize for Research in Manufacturing.

== Centers ==
- Center for Entrepreneurship
- Center for Social Ventures: Mario Avila, MBA'12, became the director of the center in July 2015.
- Financial Markets Research Center (FMRC): Directed by Professor Hans Stoll, the FMRC was founded in 1987 to research financial markets and institutions. It hosts an annual conference; speakers in the spring of 2009 included Paul Volcker, Stephen Axilrod, and William Dudley). Co-director of the FMRC is Robert E. Whaley.

== Alumni ==
=== Academia ===
- Marjorie K. Eastman, MBA'12 – author of The Frontline Generation
- Eric L. Harry, MBA'83 – American author best known for his novels Arc Light and Invasion
- C. Turney Stevens, Jr., MBA'81 – Dean of the College of Business at Lipscomb University
- Craig Fleisher, MBA – scholar and author in the fields of public affairs, competitive intelligence and analysis
- Millicent Lownes-Jackson, MBA – founder, The World Institute for Sustainable Education and Research (The WISER Group)

=== Business ===
- Anu Aiyengar, MBA'99 – Head of Mergers and Acquisitions at JPMorgan Chase & Co
- Jim Beavers, MBA '96 – Director of Marketing for Capitol Records
- David Farr, MBA'81 – Chairman and CEO of Emerson Electric
- Adena Friedman, MBA'93 – President and CEO of NASDAQ
- Mahni Ghorashi, MBA '12 – Co-founder of Clear Labs
- David Bronson Ingram, MBA'89 – Chairman and CEO of Ingram Entertainment
- John R. Ingram, MBA'86 – Chairman of Ingram Content Group and Ingram Industries
- Prashant Khemka, MBA'98 – CIO of Global Emerging Markets Equity at Goldman Sachs; Founder of White Oak Capital Management
- Max Lytvyn, MBA'04 – billionaire co-founder of Grammarly
- R. Brad Martin, MBA'80 – Chairman of FedEx, former Chairman and CEO of Saks, Inc.
- Doug Parker, MBA'86 – Chairman and CEO of American Airlines Group
- James C. Tsai, MBA'98 – President of New York Eye and Ear Infirmary of Mount Sinai
- Philip C. Wolf, MBA '80 – Founder and CEO of PhoCusWright

=== Government ===
- Megan Barry, MBA'93 – Mayor of Nashville
- Jim Bryson, MBA'85 – member of the Tennessee State Senate
- John Cooper, MBA '85 – Mayor of Nashville; former Global Head of Technology Investment Banking at Lehman Brothers
- Bruce Heyman, MBA'80 – 30th United States Ambassador to Canada, former Vice President of Goldman Sachs
- Francis Guess (M.B.A.) – businessman and civil rights advocate, United States Commission on Civil Rights
- Jonathan Jordan MBA '92 – member of the North Carolina House of Representatives
- Paul C. Ney Jr., JD, MBA'84 – General Counsel of the U.S. Department of Defense
- Ihor Petrashko, MBA '01 – Minister of Economic Development and Trade of Ukraine
- Steven Reed, MBA'04 – first African-American Mayor of Montgomery, Alabama
- Tom Tait, MBA'85 – Mayor of Anaheim, California

== See also ==
- List of United States business school rankings
- List of business schools in the United States
