= Romanization of Japanese =

Japanese language written in Latin script

The romanization of Japanese is the use of Latin script to write the Japanese language. This method of writing is sometimes referred to in Japanese as rōmaji (ローマ字; lit. 'Roman letters', [ɾoːma(d)ʑi] or [ɾoːmaꜜ(d)ʑi]).

Japanese is normally written in a combination of logographic characters borrowed from Chinese characters (kanji), and syllabic scripts (kana) that are simplified variants of Chinese characters, either as cursive modifications (hiragana) or as character parts (katakana). There are, however, several different romanization systems. The three main ones are Hepburn romanization, Kunrei-shiki romanization (ISO 3602) and Nihon-shiki romanization (ISO 3602 Strict). Variants of the Hepburn system are the most widely used.

Romanized Japanese may be used in any context where Japanese text is targeted at non-Japanese speakers who cannot read kanji or kana, such as for names on street signs and passports and in dictionaries and textbooks for foreign learners of the language. It is also used to transliterate Japanese terms in text written in English (or other languages that use the Latin script) on topics related to Japan, such as linguistics, literature, history, and culture.

All Japanese who have attended elementary school since the Allied occupation began in the aftermath of World War II have been taught to read and write romanized Japanese. Therefore, almost all Japanese can read and write Japanese by using rōmaji. However, it is extremely rare in Japan to use it to write Japanese (except as an input tool on a computer or for special purposes such as logo design), and most Japanese are more comfortable in reading kanji and kana.

== History ==
The earliest Japanese romanization system was based on Portuguese orthography. It was developed c. 1548 by a Japanese Catholic named Anjirō. Jesuit priests used the system in a series of printed Catholic books so that missionaries could preach and teach their converts without learning to read Japanese orthography. The most useful of these books for the study of early modern Japanese pronunciation and early attempts at romanization was the Nippo Jisho, a Japanese–Portuguese dictionary written in 1603. In general, the early Portuguese system was similar to Nihon-shiki in its treatment of vowels. Some consonants were transliterated differently: for instance, the /k/ consonant was rendered, depending on context, as either c or q, and the /ɸ/ consonant (now pronounced /h/, except before u) as f; and so Nihon no kotoba ("The language of Japan") was spelled Nifon no cotoba. The Jesuits also printed some secular books in romanized Japanese, including the first printed edition of the Japanese classic The Tale of the Heike, romanized as Feiqe no monogatari, and a collection of Aesop's Fables (romanized as Esopo no fabulas). The latter continued to be printed and read after the suppression of Christianity in Japan (Chibbett, 1977).

From the mid-19th century onward, several systems were developed, culminating in the Hepburn system, named after James Curtis Hepburn who used it in the third edition of his Japanese–English dictionary, published in 1887. The Hepburn system included representation of some sounds that have since changed. For example, Lafcadio Hearn's book Kwaidan shows the older kw- pronunciation; in modern Hepburn romanization, this would be written Kaidan (lit. 'ghost tales').

=== As a replacement for the Japanese writing system ===
In the Meiji era (1868–1912), some Japanese scholars advocated abolishing the Japanese writing system entirely and using rōmaji instead. The Nihon-shiki romanization was an outgrowth of that movement. Several Japanese texts were published entirely in rōmaji during this period, but it failed to catch on. Later, in the early 20th century, some scholars devised syllabary systems with characters derived from Latin (rather like the Cherokee syllabary) that were even less popular since they were not based on any historical use of the Latin script.

Today, the use of Nihon-shiki for writing Japanese is advocated by the Oomoto sect and some independent organizations. During the Allied occupation of Japan, the government of the Supreme Commander for the Allied Powers (SCAP) made it official policy to romanize Japanese. However, that policy failed and a more moderate attempt at Japanese script reform followed.

== Modern systems ==
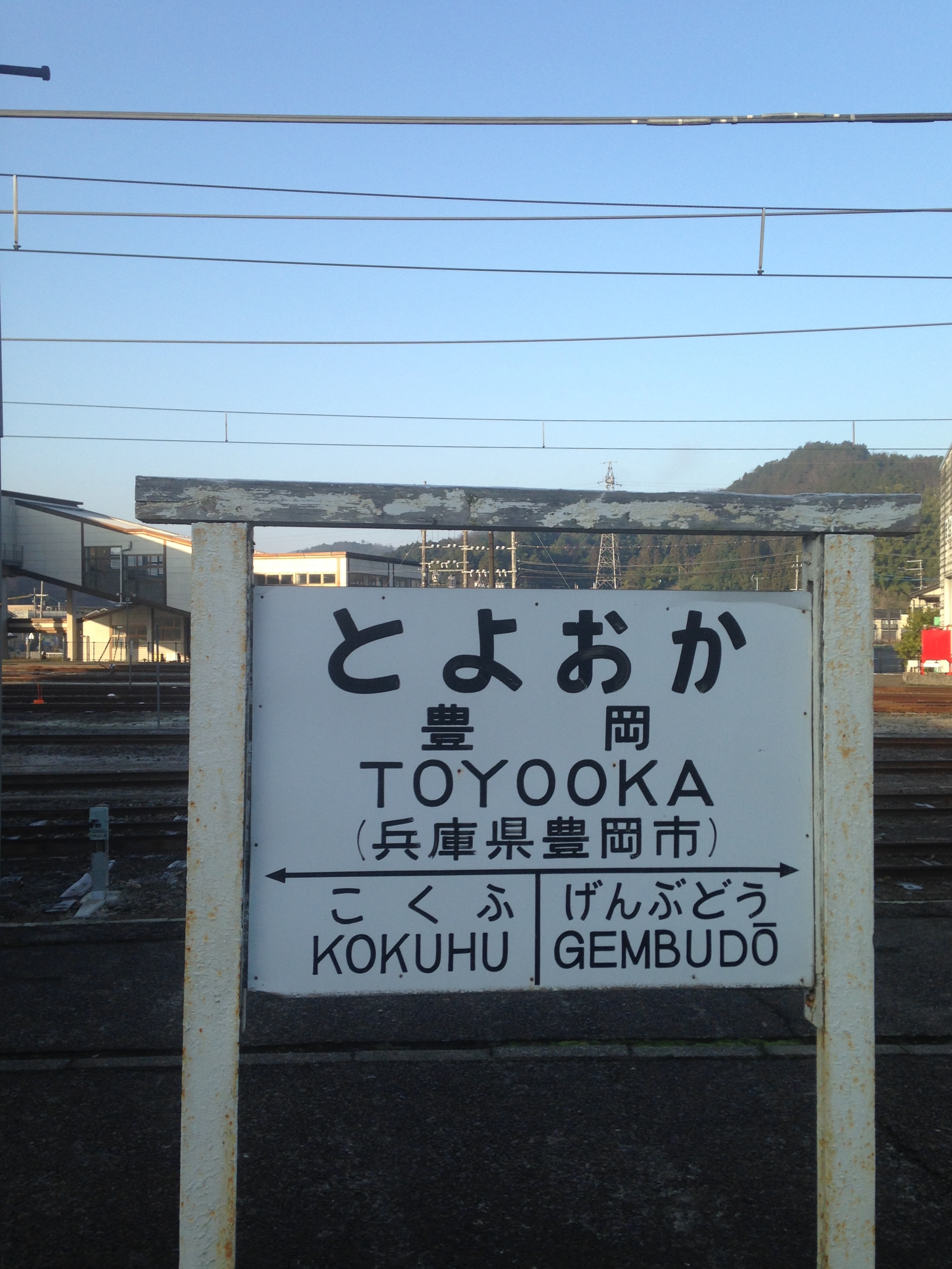
Old sign from the JNR era at Toyooka Station shows inconsistent romanization. Although in principle Hepburn is used, Kokuhu is the kunrei-shiki form (which would be Kokufu in Hepburn).

=== Hepburn ===
Hepburn romanization generally follows English phonology with Romance vowels. It is an intuitive method of showing Anglophones the pronunciation of a word in Japanese. It was standardized in the United States as American National Standard System for the Romanization of Japanese (Modified Hepburn), but that status was abolished on October 6, 1994. Hepburn is the most common romanization system in use today, especially in the English-speaking world.

The Revised Hepburn system of romanization uses a macron to indicate some long vowels and an apostrophe to note the separation of easily confused phonemes (usually, syllabic n ん from a following naked vowel or semivowel). For example, the name じゅんいちろう is written with the kana characters ju-n-i-chi-ro-u, and romanized as Jun'ichirō in Revised Hepburn. Without the apostrophe, it would not be possible to distinguish this correct reading from the incorrect ju-ni-chi-ro-u (じゅにちろう). This system is widely used in Japan and among foreign students and academics.

=== Nihon-shiki ===
Nihon-shiki romanization was originally invented as a method for Japanese to write their own language in Latin characters, rather than to transcribe it for Westerners as Hepburn was. It strictly follows the Japanese syllabary, with no adjustments for changes in pronunciation. It has also been standardized as ISO 3602 Strict. Also known as Nippon-shiki, rendered in the Nihon-shiki style of romanization the name is either Nihon-siki or Nippon-siki.

=== Kunrei-shiki ===
Kunrei-shiki romanization is a slightly modified version of Nihon-shiki which eliminates differences between the kana syllabary and modern pronunciation. For example, the characters づ and ず are pronounced identically in modern Japanese, and thus Kunrei-shiki and Hepburn ignore the difference in kana and represent the sound in the same way (zu). Nihon-shiki, on the other hand, will romanize づ as du, but ず as zu. Similarly for the pair じ and ぢ, they are both zi in Kunrei-shiki and ji in Hepburn, but are zi and di respectively in Nihon-shiki. See the table below for full details.

Kunrei-shiki has been standardized by the Japanese Government and the International Organization for Standardization as ISO 3602. Kunrei-shiki is taught to Japanese elementary school students in their fourth year of education.

Written in Kunrei-shiki, the name of the system would be rendered Kunreisiki.

=== Other variants ===
It is possible to elaborate these romanizations to enable non-native speakers to pronounce Japanese words more correctly. Typical additions include tone marks to note the Japanese pitch accent and diacritic marks to distinguish phonological changes, such as the assimilation of the moraic nasal /ɴ/ (see Japanese phonology).

=== JSL ===
JSL is a romanization system based on Japanese phonology, designed using the linguistic principles used by linguists in designing writing systems for languages that do not have any. It is a purely phonemic system, using exactly one symbol for each phoneme, and marking the pitch accent using diacritics. It was created for Eleanor Harz Jorden's system of Japanese language teaching. Its principle is that such a system enables students to internalize the phonology of Japanese better. Since it does not have any of the other systems' advantages for non-native speakers, and the Japanese already have a writing system for their language, JSL is not widely used outside the educational environment.

== Non-standard romanization ==
In addition to the standardized systems above, there are many variations in romanization, used either for simplification, in error or confusion between different systems, or for deliberate stylistic reasons.

Notably, the various mappings that Japanese input methods use to convert keystrokes on a Roman keyboard to kana often combine features of all of the systems; when used as plain text rather than being converted, these are usually known as wāpuro rōmaji. (Wāpuro is a blend of wādo purosessā word processor.) Unlike the standard systems, wāpuro rōmaji requires no characters from outside the ASCII character set.

While there may be arguments in favour of some of these variant romanizations in specific contexts, their use, especially if mixed, leads to confusion when romanized Japanese words are indexed. This confusion never occurs when inputting Japanese characters with a word processor, because input Latin letters are transliterated into Japanese kana as soon as the IME processes what character is input.

=== Dzu ===
A common practice is to romanize づ as dzu, allowing to distinguish it from both ドゥ du and ず zu. For example, it can be seen in the style of romanization Google Translate adheres to. It is not to be conflated with the older form of Hepburn romanization, which used dzu for both ず and づ.

=== Long vowels ===
In addition, the following three "non-Hepburn rōmaji" (非ヘボン式ローマ字, hi-Hebon-shiki rōmaji) methods of representing long vowels are authorized by the Japanese Foreign Ministry for use in passports.

- oh for おお or おう (Hepburn ō).
- oo for おお or おう. This is valid JSL romanization. For Hepburn romanization, it is not a valid romanization if the long vowel belongs within a single word.
- ou for おう. This is also an example of wāpuro rōmaji.

== Example words written in each romanization system ==
English	Japanese	Kana spelling	Romanization		
English	Japanese	Kana spelling	Revised Hepburn	Kunrei-shiki	Nihon-shiki
Roman characters	ローマ字	ローマじ	rōmaji	rômazi	rômazi
Mount Fuji	富士山	ふじさん	Fujisan	Huzisan	Huzisan
tea	お茶	おちゃ	ocha	otya	otya
governor	知事	ちじ	chiji	tizi	tizi
to shrink	縮む	ちぢむ	chijimu	tizimu	tidimu
to continue	続く	つづく	tsuzuku	tuzuku	tuduku

== Differences among romanizations ==
This chart shows in full the three main systems for the romanization of Japanese: Hepburn, Nihon-shiki and Kunrei-shiki:

Hiragana	Katakana	Hepburn	Nihon-shiki	Kunrei-shiki	IPA
あ	ア	a			
い	イ	i			
う	ウ	u			ɯ
え	エ	e			
お	オ	o			
か	カ	ka			
き	キ	ki			kʲi
く	ク	ku			kɯ
け	ケ	ke			
こ	コ	ko			
きゃ	キャ	kya			kʲa
きゅ	キュ	kyu			kʲɯ
きょ	キョ	kyo			kʲo
さ	サ	sa			
し	シ	shi	si		ɕi
す	ス	su			sɯ
せ	セ	se			
そ	ソ	so			
しゃ	シャ	sha	sya		ɕa
しゅ	シュ	shu	syu		ɕɯ
しょ	ショ	sho	syo		ɕo
た	タ	ta			
ち	チ	chi	ti		tɕi
つ	ツ	tsu	tu		tsɯ
て	テ	te			
と	ト	to			
ちゃ	チャ	cha	tya		tɕa
ちゅ	チュ	chu	tyu		tɕɯ
ちょ	チョ	cho	tyo		tɕo
な	ナ	na			
に	ニ	ni			ɲi
ぬ	ヌ	nu			nɯ
ね	ネ	ne			
の	ノ	no			
にゃ	ニャ	nya			ɲa
にゅ	ニュ	nyu			ɲɯ
にょ	ニョ	nyo			ɲo
は	ハ	ha			
ひ	ヒ	hi			çi
ふ	フ	fu	hu		ɸɯ
へ	ヘ	he			
ほ	ホ	ho			
ひゃ	ヒャ	hya			ça
ひゅ	ヒュ	hyu			çɯ
ひょ	ヒョ	hyo			ço
ま	マ	ma			
み	ミ	mi			mʲi
む	ム	mu			mɯ
め	メ	me			
も	モ	mo			
みゃ	ミャ	mya			mʲa
みゅ	ミュ	myu			mʲɯ
みょ	ミョ	myo			mʲo
や	ヤ	ya			ja
ゆ	ユ	yu			jɯ
よ	ヨ	yo			jo
ら	ラ	ra			ɾa
り	リ	ri			ɾʲi
る	ル	ru			ɾɯ
れ	レ	re			ɾe
ろ	ロ	ro			ɾo
りゃ	リャ	rya			ɾʲa
りゅ	リュ	ryu			ɾʲɯ
りょ	リョ	ryo			ɾʲo
わ	ワ	wa			βa
ゐ	ヰ	i	wi	i	
ゑ	ヱ	e	we	e	
を	ヲ	o	wo	o	
ゐゃ	ヰャ	iya	wya	iya	βʲa
ゐゅ	ヰュ	iyu	wyu	iyu	βʲɯ
ゐょ	ヰョ	iyo	wyo	iyo	βʲo
ん	ン	n-n'(-m)	n-n'		m~n~ŋ~ɴ
が	ガ	ga			
ぎ	ギ	gi			gʲi
ぐ	グ	gu			gɯ
げ	ゲ	ge			
ご	ゴ	go			
ぎゃ	ギャ	gya			gʲa
ぎゅ	ギュ	gyu			gʲɯ
ぎょ	ギョ	gyo			gʲo
ざ	ザ	za			za~dza
じ	ジ	ji	zi		ʑi~dʑi
ず	ズ	zu			zɯ~dzɯ
ぜ	ゼ	ze			ze~dze
ぞ	ゾ	zo			zo~dzo
じゃ	ジャ	ja	zya		ʑa~dʑa
じゅ	ジュ	ju	zyu		ʑɯ~dʑɯ
じょ	ジョ	jo	zyo		ʑo~dʑo
だ	ダ	da			
ぢ	ヂ	ji	di	zi	ʑi~dʑi
づ	ヅ	zu	du	zu	zɯ~dzɯ
で	デ	de			
ど	ド	do			
ぢゃ	ヂャ	ja	dya	zya	ʑa~dʑa
ぢゅ	ヂュ	ju	dyu	zyu	ʑɯ~dʑɯ
ぢょ	ヂョ	jo	dyo	zyo	ʑo~dʑo
ば	バ	ba			
び	ビ	bi			bʲi
ぶ	ブ	bu			bɯ
べ	ベ	be			
ぼ	ボ	bo			
びゃ	ビャ	bya			bʲa
びゅ	ビュ	byu			bʲɯ
びょ	ビョ	byo			bʲo
ぱ	パ	pa			
ぴ	ピ	pi			pʲi
ぷ	プ	pu			pɯ
ぺ	ペ	pe			
ぽ	ポ	po			
ぴゃ	ピャ	pya			pʲa
ぴゅ	ピュ	pyu			pʲɯ
ぴょ	ピョ	pyo			pʲo
ゔ	ヴ	vu			βɯ

This chart shows the significant differences among them. Despite the International Phonetic Alphabet, the /j/ sound in や, ゆ, and よ are never romanized with the letter J.

Kana	Revised Hepburn	Nihon-shiki	Kunrei-shiki
うう	ū	û	
おう, おお	ō	ô	
し	shi	si	
しゃ	sha	sya	
しゅ	shu	syu	
しょ	sho	syo	
じ	ji	zi	
じゃ	ja	zya	
じゅ	ju	zyu	
じょ	jo	zyo	
ち	chi	ti	
つ	tsu	tu	
ちゃ	cha	tya	
ちゅ	chu	tyu	
ちょ	cho	tyo	
ぢ	ji	di	zi
づ	zu	du	zu
ぢゃ	ja	dya	zya
ぢゅ	ju	dyu	zyu
ぢょ	jo	dyo	zyo
ふ	fu	hu	
ゐ	i	wi	i
ゑ	e	we	e
を	o	wo	o
ん	n, n' ( m)	n n'	

== Spacing ==
Japanese is written without spaces between words, and in some cases, such as compounds, it may not be completely clear where word boundaries should lie, resulting in varying romanization styles. For example, 結婚する, meaning "to marry", and composed of the noun 結婚 (kekkon, "marriage") combined with する (suru, "to do"), is romanized as one word kekkonsuru by some authors but two words kekkon suru by others. Particles, like the possessive particle の in 君の犬 ("your dog"), are sometimes joined with the preceding term (kimino inu), or written as separate words (kimi no inu).

== Kana without standardized forms of romanization ==
There is no universally accepted style of romanization for the smaller versions of the vowels and y-row kana when used outside the normal combinations (きゃ, きょ, ファ etc.), nor for the sokuon or small tsu kana っ/ッ when it is not directly followed by a consonant. Although these are usually regarded as merely phonetic marks or diacritics, they do sometimes appear on their own, such as at the end of sentences, in exclamations, or in some names. The detached sokuon, representing a final glottal stop in exclamations, is sometimes represented as an apostrophe or as t; for example, あっ! might be written as a'! or at!.

== Historical romanizations ==
1603: Vocabvlario da Lingoa de Iapam (1603)
1604: Arte da Lingoa de Iapam (1604–1608)
1620: Arte Breve da Lingoa Iapoa (1620)
1848: Kaisei zoho Bango sen (1848)

	あ	い	う	え	お				
1603	a	i, j, y	v, u	ye	vo, uo				
1604	a	i	v	ye	vo				
1620	a	y	v	ye	vo				
1848	a	i	woe	e	o				
	か	き	く	け	こ	きゃ		きょ	くゎ
1603	ca	qi, qui	cu, qu	qe, que	co	qia		qio, qeo	qua
1604	ca	qui	cu, qu	que	co	quia		quio	qua
1620	ca, ka	ki	cu, ku	ke	co	kia		kio	qua
1848	ka	ki	kfoe	ko					
	が	ぎ	ぐ	げ	ご	ぎゃ	ぎゅ	ぎょ	ぐゎ
1603	ga	gui	gu, gv	gue	go	guia	guiu	guio	gua
1604	ga	gui	gu	gue	go		guiu	guio	gua
1620	ga, gha	ghi	gu, ghu	ghe	go, gho	ghia	ghiu	ghio	gua
1848	ga	gi	gfoe	ge	go				
	さ	し	す	せ	そ	しゃ	しゅ	しょ	
1603	sa	xi	su	xe	so	xa	xu	xo	
1604	sa	xi	su	xe	so	xa	xu	xo	
1620	sa	xi	su	xe	so	xa	xu	xo	
1848	sa	si	sfoe	se	so				
	ざ	じ	ず	ぜ	ぞ	じゃ	じゅ	じょ	
1603	za	ii, ji	zu	ie, ye	zo	ia, ja	iu, ju	io, jo	
1604	za	ji	zu		zo	ia	ju	jo	
1620	za	ji	zu	ie	zo	ia	iu	io	
1848	za	zi	zoe	ze	zo				
	た	ち	つ	て	と	ちゃ	ちゅ	ちょ	
1603	ta	chi	tçu	te	to	cha	chu	cho	
1604	ta	chi	tçu	te	to	cha	chu	cho	
1620	ta	chi	tçu	te	to	cha	chu	cho	
1848	ta	tsi	tsoe	te	to				
	だ	ぢ	づ	で	ど	ぢゃ	ぢゅ	ぢょ	
1603	da	gi	zzu	de	do	gia	giu	gio	
1604	da	gi	dzu	de	do	gia	giu	gio	
1620	da	gi	dzu	de	do	gia	giu	gio	
1848	da	dsi	dsoe	de	do				
	な	に	ぬ	ね	の	にゃ	にゅ	にょ	
1603	na	ni	nu	ne	no	nha	nhu, niu	nho, neo	
1604	na	ni	nu	ne	no	nha	nhu	nho	
1620	na	ni	nu	ne	no	nha	nhu	nho	
1848	na	ni	noe	ne	no				
	は	ひ	ふ	へ	ほ	ひゃ	ひゅ	ひょ	
1603	fa	fi	fu	fe	fo	fia	fiu	fio, feo	
1604	fa	fi	fu	fe	fo			fio	
1620	fa	fi	fu	fe	fo			fio	
1848	ha	hi	foe	he	ho				
	ば	び	ぶ	べ	ぼ	びゃ	びゅ	びょ	
1603	ba	bi	bu	be	bo	bia	biu	bio, beo	
1604	ba	bi	bu	be	bo				
1620	ba	bi	bu	be	bo	bia	biu		
1848	ba	bi	boe	be	bo				
	ぱ	ぴ	ぷ	ぺ	ぽ	ぴゃ	ぴゅ	ぴょ	
1603	pa	pi	pu	pe	po	pia		pio	
1604	pa	pi	pu	pe	po				
1620	pa	pi	pu	pe	po	pia			
1848	pa	pi	poe	pe	po				
	ま	み	む	め	も	みゃ		みょ	
1603	ma	mi	mu	me	mo	mia, mea		mio, meo	
1604	ma	mi	mu	me	mo				
1620	ma	mi	mu	me	mo			mio	
1848	ma	mi	moe	me	mo				
	や		ゆ		よ				
1603	ya		yu		yo				
1604	ya		yu		yo				
1620	ya		yu		yo				
	ら	り	る	れ	ろ	りゃ	りゅ	りょ	
1603	ra	ri	ru	re	ro	ria, rea	riu	rio, reo	
1604	ra	ri	ru	re	ro			rio	
1620	ra	ri	ru	re	ro		riu	rio	
1848	ra	ri	roe	re	ro				
	わ	ゐ		ゑ	を				
1603	va, ua				vo, uo				
1604	va	y		ye	vo				
1620	va	y		ye	vo				
1848	wa	wi		ije, ÿe	wo				
	ん								
1603	n, m, ˜ (tilde)								
1604	n								
1620	n, m								
	っ								
1603	-t, -cc-, -cch-, -cq-, -dd-, -pp-, -ss-, -tt, -xx-, -zz-								
1604	-t, -cc-, -cch-, -pp-, -cq-, -ss-, -tt-, -xx-								
1620	-t, -cc-, -cch-, -pp-, -ck-, -cq-, -ss-, -tt-, -xx-								

== Roman letter names in Japanese ==
The list below shows the Japanese readings of letters in Katakana, for spelling out words, or in acronyms. For example, NHK is read enu-eichi-kē (エヌ・エイチ・ケー). These are the standard names, based on the British English letter names (so Z is from zed, not zee), but in specialized circumstances, names from other languages may also be used. For example, musical keys are often referred to by the German names, so that B♭ is called bē (べー) from German B (German: [beː]).

- A; ē (エー, sometimes pronounced ei, エイ)
- B; bī (ビー)
- C; shī (シー, sometimes pronounced sī, スィー)
- D; dī (ディー, sometimes pronounced dē, デー)
- E; ī (イー)
- F; efu (エフ)
- G; jī (ジー)
- H; eichi or etchi (エイチ or エッチ)
- I; ai (アイ)
- J; jē (ジェー, sometimes pronounced jei, ジェイ)
- K; kē (ケー, sometimes pronounced kei, ケイ)
- L; eru (エル)
- M; emu (エム)
- N; enu (エヌ)
- O; ō (オー)
- P; pī (ピー)
- Q; kyū (キュー)
- R; āru (アール)
- S; esu (エス)
- T; tī (ティー)
- U; yū (ユー)
- V; bui or vī (ブイ or ヴィー)
- W; daburyū (ダブリュー)
- X; ekkusu (エックス)
- Y; wai (ワイ)
- Z; zetto (ゼット)

Sources: Kōjien (7th edition), Daijisen (online version). Daijisen does not mention the name vī, while Kōjien does.

== See also ==
- Cyrillization of Japanese
- Japanese writing system
- List of ISO romanizations
- Transcription into Japanese
