= Philip C. Wolf =

American entrepreneur (1956–2021)

Philip C. Wolf (July 2, 1956 – March 16, 2021) was an American entrepreneur and executive known for his work in the travel, tourism and hospitality industry. The founder and former CEO of travel industry research firm PhoCusWright, Wolf served as board director and advisor to multiple travel and technology companies.

== Career ==
=== Early career ===
Wolf held a BA in public policy studies from Duke University and an MBA in finance from Vanderbilt University's Owen Graduate School of Management.

Wolf began his travel industry career in 1989 as vice president, travel agency operations for booking engine pioneer Travelmation. In 1990 he became president and CEO. During his tenure, Travelmation secured two intellectual property patents for its airfare pricing algorithms, and, in 1991, the company introduced a travel booking engine application to clients including Macy's, Nestle and American National Can. The following year, Travelmation was acquired by Rosenbluth International (now part of American Express).

=== PhoCusWright Inc. ===
Following his departure from Travelmation, Wolf in 1994 founded PhoCusWright Inc., Fodor's and The New York Times were among the company's early clients. In 1997, PhoCusWright held its first travel industry event, PhoCusWright Live, at which travel industry executives debated the future of online travel booking. The following year, the company founded its research division.

PhoCusWright has been described as one of the intellectual centers of the “travel technology revolution” and is credited with coining the term Travel 2.0. In addition to conducting primary travel industry research in North America, Latin America, Europe and Asia, the company produces conferences including The PhoCusWright Conference and The Travel Innovation Summit. In June 2011, PhoCusWright was acquired by Northstar Travel Group. Following the acquisition, Wolf served as chairman until 2013.

=== Travel industry impact and board work ===
Wolf was a travel industry advisor and speaker. As co-founder and chairman of Independent Travel Technology Association (ITTA), Wolf advocated for telecommunications legislation to foster travel industry competition and accelerate the development of advanced information networks. In 2007, Travel Weekly named Wolf as one of the 33 most influential people in travel, and Skift in 2014 included him among its Skift 30: Travel's Top Online Movers and Shakers, noting that he “defined online travel for a whole industry.” He was a former adjunct professor at NYU's Preston Robert Tisch Center for Hospitality, Tourism and Sports Management and has been a distinguished lecturer at Cornell University School of Hotel Administration.

In addition to the sale of PhoCusWright, Wolf was involved in the sale of Newtrade Technologies to Expedia (2002), TravelJigsaw (now rentalcars.com) to Priceline (2010) and the IPO of MakeMyTrip on NASDAQ (2010).

He served as board director for travel and technology companies including MakeMyTrip, eDreams Odigeo, Travel.ru (formerly Oktogo.ru), Hopper, and TrustYou. He was also an investor in India's GlobalTHEN.

Wolf formerly served as chairman of QuickMobile and board director for Wandrian, Spafinder, VFM Interactive, Newtrade Technologies, Cruise411, TravelJigsaw, and Inntopia.

== See also ==
- Phocuswright
- Phocuswire
