= Nihon-shiki =

Japanese language romanization system

Nihon-shiki (Japanese: 日本式ローマ字, Hepburn: Nihon-shiki rōmaji; lit. 'Japan-style Roman letters') is a romanization system for transliterating the Japanese language into the Latin alphabet. Among the major romanization systems for Japanese, it is the most regular one and has an almost one-to-one relation to the kana writing system. Its name is rendered Nihonsiki in the system itself.

== History ==
Nihon-shiki was invented by physicist Aikitsu Tanakadate in 1885, with the intention to replace the Hepburn system of romanization. Tanakadate's intention was to replace the traditional kanji and kana system of writing Japanese completely by a romanized system, which he felt would make it easier for Japan to compete with Western countries. Since the system was created by a native Japanese speaker and was intended for Japanese people to use to write their own language, it is much more regular than Hepburn romanization, and unlike Hepburn's system, it makes no effort to make itself easier to pronounce for English-speakers.

Nihon-shiki was followed by Kunrei-shiki, which was adopted in 1937, after a political debate over whether Nihon-shiki or Hepburn romanization should be used by the Japanese government. Kunrei-shiki is nearly identical to Nihon-shiki, but it merges syllable pairs di/zi ぢ/じ, du/zu づ/ず, dya/zya ぢゃ/じゃ, dyu/zyu ぢゅ/じゅ, dyo/zyo ぢょ/じょ, wi/i ゐ/い, we/e ゑ/え, kwa/ka くゎ/か, and gwa/ga ぐゎ/が, whose pronunciations in Modern Standard Japanese are now identical. For example, the word かなづかい, rendered kanadukai in Nihon-shiki, is pronounced as kanazukai in modern Japanese, and is romanized as such in kunrei-shiki. The International Organization for Standardization has standardized kunrei-shiki, under ISO 3602. The JSL system, which is intended for use instructing foreign students of Japanese, is also based on Nihon-shiki. However, some Japanese-speakers still distinguish di from zi and du from zu and so Nihon-shiki spelling is not entirely obsolete.

Nihon-shiki is considered the most regular of the romanization systems for the Japanese language because it maintains a strict "one kana, two letters" form. Because it has unique forms corresponding to each of the respective pairs of kana homophones listed above, it is the only formal system of romanization that can allow (almost) lossless ("round trip") mapping, but the standard does not mandate the precise spellings needed to distinguish ô 王/おう, ou 追う/おう and oo 大/おお.

== Romanization charts ==
gozyûon					yôon		
あ/ア a	い/イ i	う/ウ u	え/エ e	お/オ o	(ya)	(yu)	(yo)
か/カ ka	き/キ ki	く/ク ku	け/ケ ke	こ/コ ko	きゃ/キャ kya	きゅ/キュ kyu	きょ/キョ kyo
さ/サ sa	し/シ si	す/ス su	せ/セ se	そ/ソ so	しゃ/シャ sya	しゅ/シュ syu	しょ/ショ syo
た/タ ta	ち/チ ti	つ/ツ tu	て/テ te	と/ト to	ちゃ/チャ tya	ちゅ/チュ tyu	ちょ/チョ tyo
な/ナ na	に/ニ ni	ぬ/ヌ nu	ね/ネ ne	の/ノ no	にゃ/ニャ nya	にゅ/ニュ nyu	にょ/ニョ nyo
は/ハ ha	ひ/ヒ hi	ふ/フ hu	へ/ヘ he	ほ/ホ ho	ひゃ/ヒャ hya	ひゅ/ヒュ hyu	ひょ/ヒョ hyo
ま/マ ma	み/ミ mi	む/ム mu	め/メ me	も/モ mo	みゃ/ミャ mya	みゅ/ミュ myu	みょ/ミョ myo
や/ヤ ya		ゆ/ユ yu		よ/ヨ yo			
ら/ラ ra	り/リ ri	る/ル ru	れ/レ re	ろ/ロ ro	りゃ/リャ rya	りゅ/リュ ryu	りょ/リョ ryo
わ/ワ wa	ゐ/ヰ wi *		ゑ/ヱ we *	を/ヲ wo			
				ん/ン n			
voiced sounds (dakuten)
が/ガ ga	ぎ/ギ gi	ぐ/グ gu	げ/ゲ ge	ご/ゴ go	ぎゃ/ギャ gya	ぎゅ/ギュ gyu	ぎょ/ギョ gyo
ざ/ザ za	じ/ジ zi	ず/ズ zu	ぜ/ゼ ze	ぞ/ゾ zo	じゃ/ジャ zya	じゅ/ジュ zyu	じょ/ジョ zyo
だ/ダ da	ぢ/ヂ di	づ/ヅ du	で/デ de	ど/ド do	ぢゃ/ヂャ dya	ぢゅ/ヂュ dyu	ぢょ/ヂョ dyo
ば/バ ba	び/ビ bi	ぶ/ブ bu	べ/ベ be	ぼ/ボ bo	びゃ/ビャ bya	びゅ/ビュ byu	びょ/ビョ byo
ぱ/パ pa	ぴ/ピ pi	ぷ/プ pu	ぺ/ペ pe	ぽ/ポ po	ぴゃ/ピャ pya	ぴゅ/ピュ pyu	ぴょ/ピョ pyo
くゎ/クヮ kwa *							
ぐゎ/グヮ gwa *							

=== Notes ===
- In the table above, characters marked with an asterisk (*) are obsolete in modern Japanese.
- Unlike Kunrei-shiki and Hepburn:
  - Even when he (へ) is used as a particle, it is written as he, not e.
  - Even when ha (は) is used as a particle, it is written as ha, not wa.
  - Even when wo (を) is used as a particle, it is written as wo, not o.
- Syllabic n (ん) is written as n before consonants but as n' before vowels and y.
- Much like Kunrei-shiki:
  - Long vowels are indicated by a circumflex accent, for example: long o is written ô. Similarly, Hepburn uses a macron: ō.
  - Geminate consonants are always marked by doubling the consonant following the sokuon (っ).

== See also ==
- List of ISO romanizations

== Sources ==
- Gottlieb, Nanette (January 2010). "The Rōmaji movement in Japan". Journal of the Royal Asiatic Society. Third Series. 20 (1). Cambridge Journals: 75–88. doi:10.1017/S1356186309990320.
- Kent, Allen; Lancour, Harold; Daily, Jay Elwood, eds. (1 April 1978). Encyclopedia of Library and Information Science. Vol. 21. Marcel Dekker. ISBN 0824720210.

== General references ==
- Kida, Jun'ichirō (1994). "Chapter 6". Nihongo Daihakubutsukan 日本語大博物館 (in Japanese). Tokyo: Just System (ジャストシステム, Jasuto Shisutemu). ISBN 4-88309-046-9.
