= Wāpuro rōmaji =

Japanese romanization system

Wāpuro rōmaji (ワープロローマ字), or kana spelling, is a style of romanization of Japanese originally devised for entering Japanese into word processors (ワードプロセッサー, wādo purosessā; often abbreviated wāpuro) while using a Western QWERTY keyboard.

In Japanese, the more formal name is rōmaji kana henkan (ローマ字仮名変換), literally "Roman character kana conversion". One conversion method has been standardized as JIS X 4063:2000 (Keystroke to KANA Transfer Method Using Latin Letter Key for Japanese Input Method); however, the standard explicitly states that it is intended as a means of input, not as a method of romanization.

Wāpuro rōmaji is now frequently employed in general-purpose computer input as well as word processing, but the name lives on. Wāpuro-style romanizations are also frequently used by native speakers of Japanese in informal contexts, as well as by many fans of anime and other aspects of Japanese culture. A common characteristic of these (often online) cases is the avoidance of hard-to-type circumflexes or macrons. Also, some ambiguities in spelling may exist. Spellings are seen that would fail to produce the desired kana when typed on a computer, for example failure to distinguish between ず (properly entered as "zu") and づ (properly entered as "du").

== Spelling conventions ==
In practice, there are as many variants of wāpuro rōmaji as there are manufacturers of word processing and IME software. Many aspects of Hepburn, Kunrei and Nihon-shiki romanizations are accepted, so that both si (Kunrei/Nihon-shiki) and shi (Hepburn) resolve to し. Some conventions, however, differ from standard romanizations:

- Owing to the difficulty of entering diacritics like macrons or circumflexes with standard keyboards (as well as the ambiguity of ō, etc., which in Hepburn can represent either おう or おお) long vowels are almost universally entered following kana spelling rules; thus, kou for こう and koo for こお.
- The Nihon-shiki forms of romanization take precedence over other romanizations. Thus du usually produces づ rather than どぅ.
- Small kana can be entered by prefacing them with an x or l, e.g. xa for ぁ, or ltu for っ. This is commonly employed for modern katakana combinations like ティ, which would be entered as texi, thi, or t'i. However, on some systems l is treated the same as r when followed by a vowel or "y".
- じゃ, じゅ and じょ may also be romanized as jya, jyu and jyo respectively. This matches the kana closely, but is used by neither Nihon-shiki/Kunrei (which would be zya, zyu, zyo) nor Hepburn (ja, ju, jo).
- The Hepburn spelling tchi for っち may be rejected, and tti or cchi may be required instead.
- The Hepburn spelling mma is likely to be rendered っま, not the intended んま (nma). This is not an issue for revised Hepburn, which eliminates the -mm- forms in favor of -nm-.
- Moraic n, ん, can be entered as nn, n or n'. While moraic n can be typed in simply as n in some cases, in other cases it is necessary to type in a non-ambiguous form to prevent the IME from interpreting the n as belonging to a kana from the na column (な na, に ni, ぬ nu, ね ne, の no).
- Phonetic names can often be used for Japanese typographic symbols not found on standard keyboards. For example, in some IMEs ～ can be entered as nami (wave) or kara (from) and an ellipsis (...) can be entered as tenten (point point).

== Phonetic accuracy ==
Unlike Kunrei and Hepburn, the wāpuro style is based on a one-to-one transliteration of the kana. Wāpuro thus does not represent some distinctions observed in spoken Japanese, but not in writing, such as the difference between /oː/ (long vowel) and /oɯ/ (o+u). For example, in standard Japanese the kana おう can be pronounced in two different ways: as /oː/ meaning "king" (王), and as /oɯ/ meaning "to chase" (追う). Kunrei and Hepburn spell the two differently as ô/ō and ou, because the former is a long vowel while the latter has an o that happens to be followed by a u; however, wāpuro style simply transcribes the kana and renders them both as ou. Likewise, the irregularly spelled particles wa (は), e (へ) and o (を) must be entered as written (ha, he and wo respectively), not as pronounced (unlike Kunrei and Hepburn, which transcribe the pronunciation).

== See also ==
- Japanese language and computers
- Pinyin input method
