= Orfogrammka =

- A screenshot of the grammar and spell checking tool that is available to registered users on Orfogrammka.ru.
- Available in: ru
- Type: Productivity software
- Website: orfogrammka.ru

Orfogrammka (Russian: «Орфограммка») is a Russian-language style and grammar enhancement tool—similar to the English-language tool Grammarly. It is developed by Orfogrammatika, OOO (Russian: ООО «Орфограмматика») in Novosibirsk, Russia.

== History ==
On the 15 March 2012, Orfogrammatika, OOO was founded by graduate of Novosibirsk State University, Dmitry Kalashnikov (NSU '08, Specialist in Computer Science).

For many years, the company's primary consumer product, Orfogrammka was available in a freemium model; unrestricted features to free users but limited to 10 inspections per period and 500 characters per inspection. On April 29, 2017, Orfogrammatika announced the "Literary Circle" in which authors of fiction and poetry could receive a free license to the software without any limitations.

However, on May 22, 2017, the company announced that the tool would no longer be free to the general public starting on June 10, 2017. Instead, subscriptions would start at 50 rubles ($0.68) for students and 100 rubles ($1.36) for the general public.

The company later clarified that the free, unrestricted version of the tool would still be available to literary writers and teachers.

== Recognition ==
The primary consumer product Orfogrammka and business product Litera5 have been recognized all over Russian media—especially in the Novosibirsk region of Russia. In 2015, Orfogrammka was presented at the Total Dictation conference of experts and organizers in Novosibirsk, which was attended by hundreds of experts in the field from all over Russia.

== See also ==
- Natural language processing
