= Alex Jahangir =

American orthopaedic trauma surgeon

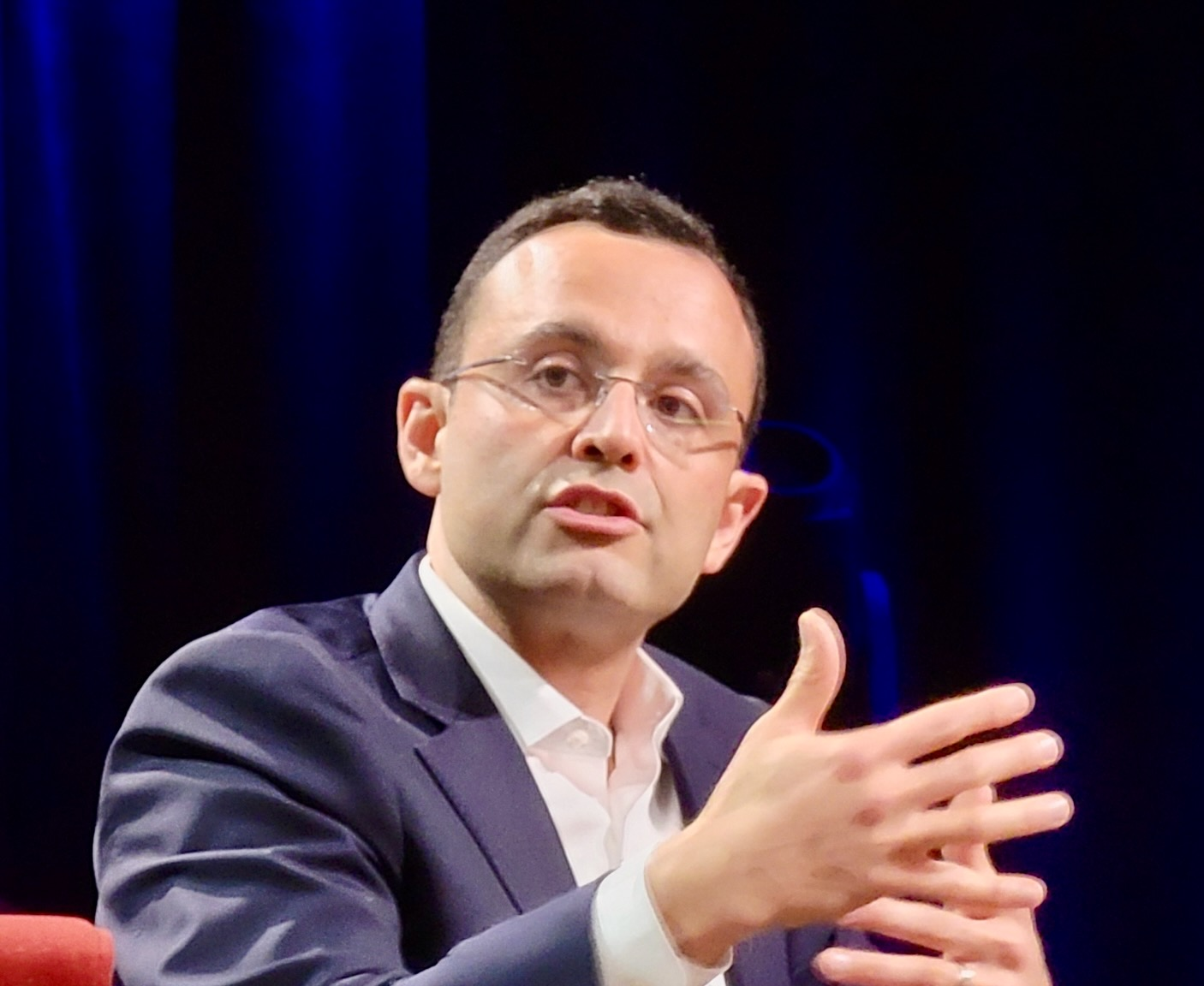
- Jahangir speaking at a local conference in Nashville in 2021 forum about leading during the pandemic
- Occupation: Orthopaedic trauma surgeon.
- Website: www.alexjahangir.com

Alex Jahangir is an American orthopaedic trauma surgeon.

== Early life and education ==
Jahangir was born in Iran and immigrated with his family to Nashville, Tennessee. He attended Metro Nashville Public Schools and graduated from Martin Luther King Jr. Magnet High School. He earned a Bachelor of Science from George Washington University and a Doctor of Medicine from the University of Tennessee Health Science Center. He completed his orthopaedic surgery residency at the Campbell Clinic in Memphis and a fellowship in orthopaedic trauma at Hennepin County Medical Center in Minneapolis. He later received a Master of Management in Health Care from the Owen Graduate School of Management at Vanderbilt University.

== Career ==
=== Academic and clinical work ===
Jahangir is a professor of Orthopaedic Surgery, Medicine, and Health Policy at Vanderbilt University Medical Center (VUMC). He joined Vanderbilt University Medical Center in 2009 as an orthopaedic trauma surgeon and became director of the Division of Orthopaedic Trauma. He later assumed roles as vice-chair of the Department of Orthopaedic Surgery, senior vice president for physician network development, and associate chief medical officer of Vanderbilt Integrated Partners.

=== Metropolitan Board of Health ===
Jahangir was appointed to the Metropolitan Board of Health of Nashville and Davidson County, where he served two terms as board chair. In 2020, he was appointed as chair of the Nashville COVID-19 Task Force, which coordinated the city's pandemic response over the following two years.

Jahangir is the co-founder and a director of Pendant Biosciences, and serves on the board of HealthStream (Nasdaq: HSTM).

== Academic contributions ==
=== Books ===
Jahangir, A. (2022) — Hot Spot: A Doctor’s Diary From the Pandemic, USA: Vanderbilt University Press, ISBN 978-0826505064(paperback); ISBN 978-0826505088 (ebook).

=== Books edited ===
- Dziadosz D., Jahangir A.A. (Section Editor, General Topics). In: Ricci W.M.; Mehta S., eds. Orthopaedic Knowledge Update: Trauma 6. Philadelphia: Wolters Kluwer; 2023.ISBN 978-1-975163-68-6
- Sethi M.K.; Obremskey W.T.; Jahangir A.A., eds. Orthopaedic Traumatology: An Evidence-Based Approach, 2nd ed. New York: Springer; 2018.ISBN 978-3-319-73391-3
- Sethi M.K.; Jahangir A.A.; Mir H.R., eds. Health Policy and Orthopaedic Trauma: Looking Back in Order to Look Forward. Journal of Orthopaedic Trauma. 2014; 28(Suppl 10).ISSN 0890-5339
- Sethi M.K.; Jahangir A.A.; Obremskey W.T., eds. Orthopaedic Traumatology: An Evidence-Based Approach. New York: Springer; 2012.ISBN 978-1-4614-3510-5

=== Selected articles ===
- Jahangir, A. (2009). "The value of mentorship in orthopaedic surgery resident education: the residents’ perspective." Journal of Bone & Joint Surgery (Am), 91(4), 1017–1022.
- Jahangir, A. (2009). "Funding of educational opportunities in orthopaedic surgery residency training: A survey of residency program directors and chairs." Journal of Bone & Joint Surgery (Am), 91(6), 1542–1545.
- Jahangir, A. (2009). "What’s new in orthopaedic trauma." Journal of Bone & Joint Surgery (Am), 91(8), 2055–2066.
- Jahangir, A. (2010). "Current management of distal femoral fractures." Current Orthopaedic Practice, 21(2), 193–197.
- Jahangir, A. (2010). "Blastomycosis: A Case Report of an Isolated Lesion in the Distal Fibula." The American Journal of Orthopedics, 39(3), E22–E24.
- Jahangir, A. (2012). "Grand rounds from Vanderbilt University: 3‑part proximal humerus fracture." Journal of Orthopaedic Trauma, 26(4), e29–e32.
- Jahangir, A. (2012). "Value‑based purchasing of medical devices." Clinical Orthopaedics and Related Research, 470(4), 1054–1064.
- Jahangir, A. (2014). "High‑energy transsyndesmotic ankle fracture dislocation — the “Logsplitter” injury." Journal of Orthopaedic Trauma, 28(4), 200–204.
- Jahangir, A. (2014). "Ankle radiographs in the early postoperative period: do they matter?" Journal of Orthopaedic Trauma, 28(9), 538–541
- Jahangir, A. (2021). "Emerging Trends in Healthcare Technology." Belmont Health Law Journal, Vol. 5.
- Jahangir, A. (2010). Orthopedic Traumatology: An Evidence‑Based Approach. Springer.
