= Japanese abbreviated and contracted words =

Abbreviated and contracted words are a common feature in the Japanese language. Long words are often contracted into shorter forms, which then become the predominant forms. For example, the University of Tokyo, in Japanese Tōkyō Daigaku (東京大学) becomes Tōdai (東大), and "remote control", rimōto kontorōru (リモートコントロール), becomes rimokon (リモコン). Names are also contracted in this way. For example, Takuya Kimura, in Japanese Kimura Takuya, an entertainer, is referred to as Kimutaku.

The names of some very familiar companies are also contractions. For example, Toshiba (東芝), is a contraction or portmanteau of Tōkyo Shibaura (東京芝浦), and Nissan (日産), is a contraction of Nippon Sangyō (日本産業).

The contractions may be commonly used, or they may be specific to a particular group of people. For example, the "Kokuritsu Kankyō Kenkyūjo" (国立環境研究所; National Institute for Environmental Sciences, NIES) is known as Kanken (環研) by its employees, but this terminology is not familiar to most Japanese.

== Patterns of contraction ==
Japanese words are spelled using characters that represent syllables (morae), rather than individual phonetic units (phonemes) as in the English alphabet. These characters are compiled into two syllabaries: hiragana and katakana. Japanese also makes extensive use of adopted Chinese characters, or kanji, which may be pronounced with one or more syllables. Therefore, when a word or phrase is abbreviated, it does not take the form of initials, but the key characters of the original phrase, such that a new word is made, often recognizably derived from the original. In contracted kanji words, the most common pattern of contraction is to take the first kanji of each word in a phrase and put them together as a portmanteau. In the example from the lead, using Tōkyō Daigaku (東京大学), the Tō- of Tōkyō and the Dai- of Daigaku becomes Tōdai (東大), the common abbreviation for the University of Tokyo.

There are also instances in which alternative readings of a particular kanji are used in the contraction. For example, Nagoya's main train station, Nagoya Station, is referred to by locals as Meieki (名駅), a contraction of "Nagoya-Eki" (名古屋駅), in which the alternative reading of Na- (名), the first character in "Nagoya", is used.

In loanwords and names, the most common pattern is to take the first two morae (or kana) of each of the two words, and combine them forming a new, single word. For example, "family restaurant" or famirī resutoran (ファミリーレストラン) becomes famiresu (ファミレス).

Yōon sounds, those sounds represented using a kana ending in i and a small ya, yu or yo kana, such as kyo count as one mora. Japanese long vowels count as two morae, and may disappear (the same can be said for the sokuon, or small tsu っ); Harry Potter, originally Harī Pottā (ハリーポッター), is contracted to Haripota (ハリポタ), or otherwise be altered; actress Kyoko Fukada, Fukada Kyōko (深田恭子), becomes Fukakyon (ふかきょん).

These abbreviated names are so common in Japan that many companies initiate abbreviations of the names of their own products. For example, the animated series Pretty Cure (プリティキュア) marketed itself under the five-character abbreviated name purikyua (プリキュア).

== Long kanji names ==
Contraction	Kanji	Original word	Full kanji	Meaning
Nikkei	日経	Nihon Keizai Shinbun	日本経済新聞	Japan Economic Times
Nōdai	農大	Tōkyō Nōgyō Daigaku	東京農業大学	Agricultural University of Tokyo
Nyūkan	入管	Nyūkoku Kanrikyoku	入国管理局	Immigration Office
kōkō	高校	kōtōgakkō	高等学校	high school
Odakyū	小田急	Odawara Kyūkō Dentetsu	小田原急行電鉄	lit. Odawara Express Electric Railway (Odakyū Electric Railway)
Tochō	都庁	Tōkyō-to Chōsha	東京都庁舎	Tokyo Metropolitan Government Building
Tōdai	東大	Tōkyō Daigaku	東京大学	University of Tokyo
Kokuren	国連	Kokusai Rengō	国際連合	The United Nations
Kansai Gaidai	関西外大	Kansai Gaikokugo Daigaku	関西外国語大学	Kansai International Language University

== Loanwords ==
=== Three and four character loanwords ===
Contraction	Katakana	Original word	Katakana	Meaning
amefuto	アメフト	amerikan futtobōru	アメリカン・フットボール	American football
anime	アニメ	animēshon	アニメーション	animation
dejikame	デジカメ	dejitaru kamera	デジタルカメラ	digital camera
depāto	デパート	depātomento sutoa	デパートメント・ストア	department store
eakon	エアコン	ea kondishonā	エアコンディショナー	air conditioner
famikon	ファミコン	famirī konpyūtā	ファミリーコンピューター	family computer (Nintendo)
famiresu	ファミレス	famirī resutoran	ファミリーレストラン	family restaurant
konbini	コンビニ	konbiniensu sutoa	コンビニエンス・ストア	convenience store
pasokon	パソコン	pāsonaru konpyūtā	パーソナルコンピューター	personal computer, PC
puroresu	プロレス	purofesshonaru resuringu	プロフェッショナル・レスリング	professional wrestling
rabuho	ラブホ	rabu hoteru	ラブホテル	love hotel
rimokon	リモコン	rimōto kontorōrā	リモートコントローラー	remote control
sando	サンド	sandouichi	サンドウィッチ	sandwich
sumaho	スマホ	sumāto fon	スマートフォン	smart phone
terebi	テレビ	terebijon	テレビジョン	TV (television)
toire	トイレ	toiretto	トイレット	toilet
wāpuro	ワープロ	wādo purosessā	ワードプロセッサー	word processor

== Abbreviations ==
Abbreviation	Japanese	Original word	Japanese	Meaning
bukatsu	部活	bukatsudō	部活動	after-school club (extracurricular) activity
shāshin	シャー芯	shāpupen no shin	シャープペンシルの芯	(in colloquial language) lead of a mechanical pencil
keitai	携帯	keitaidenwa	携帯電話	Mobile phone

== Created words ==
Many abbreviations, especially four-character words, have been created for particular products or TV shows.

Contraction	Japanese	Origin	Notes
Pokémon	ポケモン	poketto monsutā ポケットモンスター (Pocket Monster[s])	The well-known video game and animation franchise.
purikura	プリクラ	purinto kurabu プリントクラブ (Print club)	An automated photograph machine
mukku	ムック (マガジン + ブック)	magazine + book	A mook, a cross between a magazine and a book
sedoguro	セドグロ (セドリック + グロリア)	Cedric & Gloria	Nissan Cedric and Nissan Gloria luxury sedans
purosaku	プロサク (プロボックス + サクシード)	Probox & Succeed	Toyota Probox and Toyota Succeed family of vans

== Contractions of names ==
Contraction	Japanese	Name	Japanese	Notes
Burapi	ブラピ	Buraddo Pitto (Brad Pitt)	ブラッド・ピット	Hollywood actor.
Dikapuri	ディカプリ	Reonarudo Dikapurio (Leonardo DiCaprio)	レオナルド・ディカプリオ	Hollywood actor.
Fukakyon	フカキョン	Kyōko Fukada	深田恭子	Japanese idol and actress.
Hanakana	はなかな	Kana Hanazawa	花澤 香菜	actress, singer, and voice actress.
Hashiryū	橋龍	Ryūtarō Hashimoto	橋本龍太郎	politician.
Kimutaku	キムタク	Takuya Kimura	木村拓哉	SMAP star
Matsujun	松潤	Jun Matsumoto	松本 潤	Japanese idol, member of boy-band Arashi.
Matsuken	マツケン	Ken Matsudaira	松平健	Jidaigeki actor, famous for Matsuken samba.
Shimuken	シムケン	Ken Shimura	志村けん	television performer and actor.
Shuwa-chan	シュワちゃん	Ānorudo Shuwarutseneggā (Arnold Schwarzenegger)	アーノルド・シュワルツェネッガー	Hollywood actor and politician.
Yamataku	山拓	Taku Yamasaki	山崎拓	politician.
Tattsun	たっつん	Tatsuhisa Suzuki	鈴木 達央	main vocalist of OLDCODEX and voice actor.

== Highways and railway lines ==
Many highways and railway lines have names that are contractions of the names of their endpoints. For example, 東名高速道路 (Tomei Expressway) takes one kanji 東 (tō) from 東京 (Tokyo) and the other 名 (mei) from 名古屋 (Nagoya; its pronunciation changes from the kun'yomi na to the on'yomi mei). 東急東横線 (Tokyu Toyoko Line) links Tokyo and 横浜 Yokohama, taking part of its name from each city.

Other examples include:

Contraction	Japanese	Origin	Japanese
Keiyō Line	京葉線	Tokyo + Chiba	東京＋千葉
Saikyō Line	埼京線	Saitama + Tokyo	埼玉＋東京
Senzan Line	仙山線	Sendai + Yamagata	仙台＋山形
Hanshin Main Line	阪神本線	Osaka + Kobe	大阪＋神戸
Seikan Tunnel	青函トンネル	Aomori + Hakodate	青森＋函館

Sometimes names of this type preserve older place names. For instance, the character 武 is taken from the word 武蔵 (Musashi), which was once the name of the Japanese province in which the city of Tokyo was located, can still be seen in the company names 東武 (Tobu or "East Musashi"), 西武 (Seibu or "West Musashi"), and in the 南武線 (Nanbu Line or "South Musashi Line").

Some other examples:

Contraction	Japanese	Origin	Japanese
Sōbu Line	総武線	Kazusa/Shimōsa + Musashi	下総／上総＋武蔵
Uchibō Line	内房線	Inner + Bōsō Peninsula (= Awa + Kazusa)	内＋房総（＝安房＋上総）
Sotobō Line	外房線	Outer + Bōsō Peninsula (= Awa + Kazusa)	外＋房総（＝安房＋上総）
Jōban Line	常磐線	Hitachi + Iwaki	常陸＋磐城
Nippō Main Line	日豊本線	Hyūga + Buzen/Bungo	日向＋豊前／豊後
Hōhi Main Line	豊肥本線	Bungo + Higo	豊後＋肥後

== Single letters as abbreviations ==
Many single letters of the Latin alphabet have names that resemble the pronunciations of Japanese words or characters. Japanese people use them in contexts such as advertising to catch the reader's attention. Other uses of letters include abbreviations of spellings of words. Here are some examples:

- E: 良い/いい (ii; the word for "good" in Japanese). The letter appears in the name of the company e-homes.
- J: The first letter of "Japan" (日本) as in J1 League, J-Phone.
- Q: The kanji 九 きゅう ("nine") has the reading kyū. Japanese "Dial Q2" premium-rate telephone numbers start with 0990.
- S, M: used for sadism and masochism respectively, often referring to mild personality traits rather than sexual fetishes. "SM" is also used for sadomasochism, instead of "S&M" used in English, in a more sexual context.
- W: The English word "double." Japanese people sometimes pronounce the letter "double." ダブル For example, ”Wデート” (W deeto) means "double date(s)"; "WW Burger" from Freshness Burger has double beef and double cheese.

== Longer Romaji abbreviations ==
Contraction	Japanese spoken form	Origin	Notes
CM	シーエム (shī-emu)	commercial message	a single commercial or a commercial break
GP	ジーピー (jī-pī)	grand prix	a motor race or other sporting event
GW	ジーダブル(ユー) (jī-daburu(yū))	Golden Week (ゴールデンウィーク)	Golden Week is a series of four unrelated holidays within one week at the beginning of May
NEET	ニート (nīto)	no education, employment, or training	A NEET is someone who is unable or unwilling to work, and typically lives at home supported by their parents.
NG	エヌジー (enu-jī)	no good (ノーグッド)	Often used as the opposite of "OK"; a mistake while filming a scene for film or TV
OL	オーエル (ōeru)	office lady (オフィスレイヅィ)	OLs are low-level female corporate employees
PV	ピーブイ (pībui)	promotional video	the term is generally used to describe music videos and trailers
SP	エスピー (esupī)	special (スペシャル)	a TV special, a special episode of a particular TV series
VTR	ブイティーアール (buitīāru)	video tape recording	a video clip shown during a TV program for members of a panel to comment on
W杯	ワールドカップ (wārudokappu)	World Cup	Used to refer to the FIFA World Cup for soccer
