= Francis Guess =

American civil rights advocate

- Born: June 14, 1946; Nashville, Tennessee, U.S.
- Died: July 23, 2015 (aged 69); Nashville, Tennessee, U.S.
- Occupations: Businessman, civil rights advocate, and leading member of the business community
- Known for: Served on the Tennessee Commission on Human Rights for more than 30 years

Francis S. Guess (June 14, 1946 – July 23, 2015) was an American civil rights advocate who served on the Tennessee Commission on Human Rights for more than 30 years.

== Early life and education ==
Guess was raised in the Preston Taylor Homes public housing project in Nashville. He served in the United States Army in the field of military intelligence, and was in the 1st Infantry Division during the Vietnam War. Following the war, Guess enrolled at Tennessee State University, where he earned a bachelor's degree in political science. He also received a master's of business administration (MBA) from the Owen Graduate School of Management at Vanderbilt University. Guess also completed Harvard University's Senior Executives in State and Local Government program.

== Career ==
Guess served on the Tennessee Commission on Human Rights for more than 30 years. In 1983, President Ronald Reagan appointed Guess to the United States Commission on Civil Rights, a bipartisan federal civil rights commission, where he served from 1983 to 1989. Guess was also an important leader in Nashville's corporate community, serving as the vice president of The Danner Company and the owner of the Helicopter Corporation of America.

== Death ==
Guess died at his home in the Bordeaux neighborhood of Nashville, Tennessee, on July 23, 2015, at the age of 69. He was survived by his mother, Kathryn Driver; his daughter, Maria Guess; and three brothers and three sisters. His funeral was held at the Music City Center. Guess also served on the board of directors of the Nashville Convention Center Authority, which oversees the Music City Center.

In 2015, the Francis S. Guess Bridge to Equality Fund was created in his name, and in 2016, the Community Foundation of Middle Tennessee began awarding the Francis Guess Bridge to Equality Award, to recognize those who "spur innovation leading to equality."
