= Prashant Khemka =

Indian businessman

Prashant R. Khemka
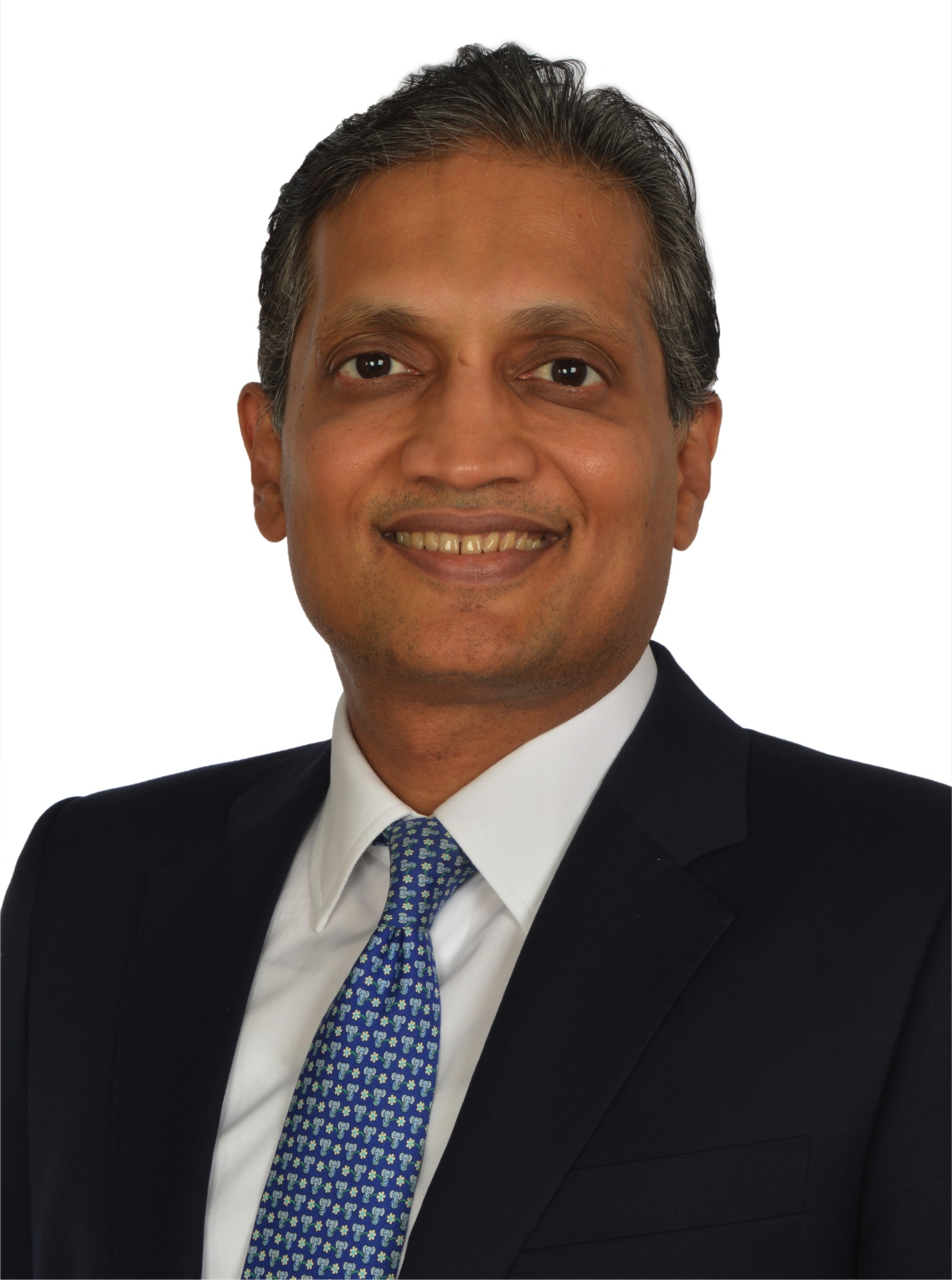
- Occupation: Business Executive
- Known for: Investment Management

Prashant R. Khemka is a CFA, the founder and managing director of WhiteOak Capital Management, and the former CIO of emerging market equities for Goldman Sachs.

== Early life and career ==
Born on 4 November 1971, in Mumbai, India, Khemka obtained an MBA in Finance from the Owen Graduate School of Management under Vanderbilt University, Nashville, Tennessee, in 1998.

He started his professional career at State Street Global Advisors in Boston.

== Life at Goldman Sachs Asset Management ==
In 2000, Khekma joined Goldman Sachs as an equity analyst and was co-chairing an equity fund worth $30 billion within four years.

After returning to India in 2006, he started managing Goldman Sachs India Equity which received a AAA rating from Citywire. Under Khemka, Goldman's Global Emerging Markets (GEM) Equity grew from less than $500 million to more than $2.6 billion.

In 2017, Khemka quit Goldman Sachs India to launch his own Mumbai-based firm, White Oak Capital Management, where he launched Ashoka India Equity Investment Trust in July 2018.

== Personal life ==
Prashant Khemka is married to Ritu Khemka and has three children. He is an avid cricket fan and was a chess enthusiast in college.
