= Coda (document editor) =

Cloud-based document editor

- Original author: Coda Project
- Developer: Coda Project
- Release: February 2019
- Platform: Web platform
- Type: Collaborative software
- Website: coda.io

Coda is a cloud-based multi-user document editor.

== Features ==
A screenshot of the Coda document editor (2022)

Coda is a document editor that provides features from spreadsheets, presentation documents, word processor files, and apps. Possible uses for Coda documents include using them as a wiki, database, or project management tool. Coda has built a formula system, much like spreadsheets commonly have, but in Coda documents, formulas can be used anywhere within the document, and can link to things that aren't just cells, including other documents, calendars or graphs. Coda also has the ability to integrate with custom third-party services, and has automations. It has offered $1 million in grants for developers that create such integrations.

== Development ==
Coda Project, Inc. was founded by Shishir Mehrotra and Alex DeNeui in June 2014. Having met at MIT, they developed the project mostly privately before announcing a public beta in October 2017. The company was named Coda, which is an anadrome for “a doc”. Coda raised $60 million in venture capital funding over two rounds by 2017. The Coda software came out of beta in February 2019. Version 1.0 had an improved user interface, new features for folders and workspaces, and permission levels for accessing files. Coda raised another $80 million in 2020, and $100 million in 2021. The 2021 funding brought Coda's valuation to $1.4 billion, making it a unicorn. In December 2024, Coda was acquired by Grammarly in an all-stock deal for an undisclosed amount. In October 2025, Grammarly rebranded as Superhuman, incorporating Coda as a core product within the new Superhuman productivity suite alongside Grammarly's writing tools, Superhuman Mail, and a new AI assistant called Superhuman Go.

== See also ==
- Cloud collaboration
- Collaborative software
- Collaborative real-time editor
- Document collaboration
