= ISO 233 =

International standard for romanization of Arabic script

The international standard ISO 233 establishes a system for romanization of Arabic script. It was supplemented by ISO 233-2 in 1993 which is specific for Arabic language.

== 1984 edition ==
The table below shows the consonants for the Arabic language.

Arabic	Latin		Unicode				Notes
Arabic	Latin		Hex		Dec		Notes
ء	ˌ		02CC		716		hamza without carrier - low vertical line
ٔ◌	ˈ		02C8		712		hamza above carrier - vertical line (high)
ٕ◌							hamza below carrier (= alif)
ا	ʾ		02BE		702		modifier letter right half ring
ب	B	b					
ت	T	t					
ث	Ṯ	ṯ	1E6E	1E6F	7790	7791	
ج	Ǧ	ǧ	01E6	01E7	486	487	
ح	Ḥ	ḥ	1E24	1E25	7716	7717	
خ	H̱	ẖ	H+0331	1E96	H+817	7830	
د	D	d					
ذ	Ḏ	ḏ	1E0E	1E0F	7694	7695	
ر	R	r					
ز	Z	z					
س	S	s					
ش	Š	š	0160	0161	352	353	
ص	Ṣ	ṣ	1E62	1E63	7778	7779	
ض	Ḍ	ḍ	1E0C	1E0D	7692	7693	
ط	Ṭ	ṭ	1E6C	1E6D	7788	7789	
ظ	Ẓ	ẓ	1E92	1E93	7826	7827	
ع	ʿ		02BF		703		modifier letter left half ring
غ	Ġ	ġ	0120	0121	288	289	
ف	F	f					
ق	Q	q					
ك	K	k					
ل	L	l					
م	M	m					
ن	N	n					
ه	H	h					
ة	T̈	ẗ	T+0308	1E97	T+776	7831	combining diaeresis
و	W	w					
ي	Y	y					
ى	Ỳ	ỳ	1EF2	1EF3	7922	7923	

== ISO 233-2:1993 ==
ISO 233-2:1993 is an ISO schema for the simplified transliteration of Arabic characters into Roman characters and is dedicated to "Arabic language – Simplified transliteration".

This transliteration system was adopted as an amendment to ISO 233:1984. It is used mainly in library context, and was introduced because ISO 233 was not meeting the indexing purposes, which are essential for the consistency of library catalogs.

According to ISO 233-2(1993), Arabic words are vocalized prior to romanization.

ISO 233-2 is used in French libraries and in North African libraries, and is recommended by ISSN for establishing key titles when cataloguing serials.

== ISO 233-3:2023 ==
ISO 233-3:2023 (previous version: ISO 233-3:1999) is dedicated to "Persian language – Simplified transliteration".

== ISO/R 233:1961 ==
ISO/R 233 is an earlier standard that has been withdrawn.

== See also ==
- Arabic transliteration
- DIN 31635
- List of ISO transliterations
