= Ralph Owen =

- Born: October 3, 1905; Hartsville, Tennessee, U.S.
- Died: 1983 (aged 77–78); Nashville, Tennessee, U.S.
- Occupation: Businessman

Ralph Owen (1905–1983) was an American businessman. He served as the Chairman of American Express (NYSE: AXP).

== Early life ==
Owen was born on October 3, 1905, in Hartsville, Tennessee. He had two brothers, Robert E. Owen and Roy Owen, and two sisters, Mrs. Mark Lowrey and Mrs. Pat W. Swaney. He graduated from Vanderbilt University in Nashville, Tennessee, in 1928.

== Career ==
In 1930, Owen founded the Equitable Securities Corporation of Nashville, an investment bank offering credit cards, travel and banking services. It merged with American Express in 1968. Later, he served as the Chairman of American Express.

Additionally, Owen served on the board of directors of the Nashville Gas Company, the R. C. Owen Company and Tennessee Natural Gas Lines Inc.

== Philanthropy ==
Owen sat on the Board of Trustees of his alma mater, Vanderbilt University, and later as the President of its Board of Trust. The Owen Graduate School of Management was renamed in his honor in 1977. Additionally, the Ralph Owen Chair is also named in his honor; it is currently by Professor Eric Johnson, Dean of the Owen Graduate School of Management.

== Personal life ==
Owen was married to Lulu Hampton. They had a son, Ralph Owen Jr., and a daughter, Melinda Bass. They resided at Brook Hill in Nashville, Tennessee.

== Death ==
Owen died at the Vanderbilt University Hospital in 1983.
