= Superhuman (email client) =

Paid email client

- Trade name: Superhuman
- Type: Private
- Founded: 2014; 12 years ago
- Founder: Rahul Vohra
- Headquarters: US
- Website: www.superhuman.com/products/mail

Superhuman is an email app founded in 2014 by Rahul Vohra.

== Utility ==
Superhuman targets users who want to improve their productivity, and features liberal use of keyboard shortcuts to speed up email reading and replying.

The app is subscription-based, charging a standard monthly fee of $30. A discounted rate of $10 per month is offered to students. According to the developer, users may save up to three hours per week with regular use of the service.

== Commercial information ==
Superhuman has raised over $100 million from venture capitalists, including Andreesen Horowitz. Initially, the app integrated only with Gmail, but in May 2022 it launched integration with Microsoft Outlook. In February 2024, Superhuman announced AI-powered drafts for instant replies.

In July 2025, Grammarly announced it would acquire Superhuman for an undisclosed amount.

In March 2026, a class-action lawsuit was filed against Superhuman after Grammarly faced widespread criticism for "Expert Review", an AI feature that generated writing feedback to users that appeared to come from notable authors and journalists, including Stephen King and Kara Swisher, without notifying or gaining permission from them.
