= Turney Stevens =

C. Turney Stevens, Jr., (born c. 1950) is the dean emeritus of the College of Business at Lipscomb University, a private Christian university in Nashville, Tennessee.

== Early life and education ==
Stevens was himself an alumnus of Lipscomb, graduating in 1972, and he earned an MBA at Vanderbilt University in 1981.

== Career ==
He worked as an investment banker for 35 years; he has cited Joe M. Rodgers (for whom he served as president of Rodgers Capital) as a mentor. He also founded several Nashville-based companies including magazine publisher PlusMedia and investment bank Harpeth Capital. Stevens joined the Lipscomb faculty in 2007, after his retirement from Harpeth, and became dean in 2008.

As dean, Stevens created the Dean Institute for Corporate Governance and Integrity, founded a student ethics program with the support of the Center for Public Trust, established a lecture series featuring ethical business people, and offered ethics training to local corporate leaders. On the basis of these activities, Ethisphere magazine named him as one of "2009's 100 most influential people in business ethics". In 2014, Stevens moved into an emeritus role, focusing on fundraising for the college.
