= Clear Labs =

American genomics testing company

Clear Labs, Inc.
- Type: Private
- Industry: Clinical and applied markets
- Founded: 2014
- Founders: Sasan Amini, Mahni Ghorashi
- Headquarters: San Carlos, California, United States
- Area served: Global
- Key people: Sasan Amini, CEO and Co-founder; Ramin Khaksar, CSO, COO, and Co-founder
- Products: Fully automated genomics testing
- Number of employees: 50+
- Website: www.clearlabs.com

Clear Labs, Inc. is a private genomics testing company headquartered in San Carlos, California, United States. It offers a fully automated, next-generation sequencing (NGS) platform for turnkey diagnostics, including SARS-CoV-2 genomic characterization and detection of foodborne pathogens such as listeria and salmonella. It can also verify a food's ingredients, its GMO status, or conduct other tests.

== History ==
Clear Labs was co-founded by Sasan Amini and Mahni Ghorashi in 2014, who left their jobs at a genomics company to start Clear Labs. The company acquired $6.5 million in series A financing in September 2015. In December 2016, the company closed a $16 million Series B funding round. This was followed by another $21 million round in October 2018.

Clear Labs was granted an Emergency Use Authorization (EUA) from the US FDA in September 2020 for its SARS-CoV-2 descriptive diagnostic test. Clear Labs launched in January 2021 a groundbreaking solution for whole genome sequencing surveillance of SARS-CoV-2 and its mutations. Clear Labs announced in March 2021 that the company had reached a critical milestone of over 50% public health laboratory penetration with its whole genome sequencing SARS-CoV-2 product, including laboratories such as Nebraska, Nevada, New York, California and Kansas, among others. Clear Labs Raised a $60M Series C round led by Morgan Stanley and T. Rowe Price in May 2021.

Clear Labs has also received governmental and professional certification for its food safety next generation sequencing platform, including from the International AOAC in December 2019 and the National Poultry Improvement Plan in October 2021.
