= Max Lytvyn =

Canadian-Ukrainian entrepreneur (born 1977)

- Born: December 3, 1977 (age 48); Kyiv, Kyiv Oblast, Ukraine
- Occupations: Entrepreneur; software developer
- Known for: co-founder of Grammarly

Max Lytvyn (Ukrainian: Макс Литвин) is a Canadian-Ukrainian programmer and billionaire, co-founder of Grammarly.

== Biography ==
He studied at the English-language International Christian University (a Kyiv higher education institution that existed until 2013).

In 2004, he went to study at the University of Toronto for a master's program.

In 2004, together with Oleksiy Shevchenko, he launched his first company, MyDropbox in Toronto. Their service checked student papers for plagiarism. By 2007, it was used by 800 universities. A year later, Shevchenko and Lytvyn sold the service to Blackboard. Under the agreement, Max worked at Blackboard for another two years.

In 2009, together with Oleksiy Shevchenko and Dmytro Lider, he founded Grammarly — an online service for checking English text spelling and grammar. In 2019, the company became valued at $1 billion. In 2021 — $13 billion.

== Net worth ==
- In 2020, Max Lytvyn's net worth was $250 million, ranking 36th on the Forbes list of the richest Ukrainians.
- In 2022, Max Lytvyn's net worth was $4 billion (in February) and $2.3 billion (in December), ranking 2nd on the Forbes list of the richest Ukrainians.
- In 2023, "NV. Business" estimated Max Lytvyn's net worth at $865 million. He ranked 7th on the list of the richest Ukrainians.
