= Northstar Travel Group =

Travel publications and event management company

- Type: Privately held company
- Industry: Travel
- Founded: 6 August 2001
- Headquarters: Rutherford, New Jersey, U.S.
- Owner: JTB Corporation
- Website: www.northstartravelgroup.com

Northstar Travel Group (NTG) is a publications and event management company focused on the travel industry. The firm is headquartered in Rutherford, New Jersey.

Its brands include Business Travel News, Travel Procurement, The Beat, Travel Weekly, Travel Pulse, TravelAge West, Travel Weekly China, Successful Meetings, Meetings & Conventions, Incentive, M&C China, Travel42, Axus Travel App, and Web in Travel. It also owns Phocuswright, a research, business intelligence, and event producer serving the travel technology industry, and its publication, Phocuswire.

It produces more than 80 events in 13 countries related to the travel industry, including the Phocuswright Conference, ALIS (the largest hotel investment conference in the world; produced with the American Hotel and Lodging Association annually in Los Angeles), The Business Travel Show, Web in Travel, CruiseWorld, Global Travel Marketplace, and TEAMS. The firm owns a majority of Inntopia. Northstar also hosts The Meetings Show, a series of conferences for the conference industry.

Print media accounts for 18% of total revenue, events accounts for 39.2% of revenue, and digital revenue accounts for 42.7% of revenue.

== History ==
In 1989, Reed International (now RELX) acquired Travel Weekly, Meetings & Conventions and the hotel databases from Murdoch Magazines and formed Reed Travel Group. In 1998, Reed Travel Group was renamed Cahners Travel Group.

In 2001, Boston Ventures acquired Cahners Travel Group and renamed it Northstar Travel Group. In 2012, Boston Ventures Investment Partners sold the company to Wicks Group.

In October 2019, three years after being acquired by Wasserstein & Co., the company purchased travAlliancemedia, owner of TravelPulse.com and TravelPulse Canada, Buying Business Travel, covering the corporate travel market, and CAT Media, which serves the meetings and incentives industries.

In October 2025, it was announced that Japan's JTB Corporation had completed its acquisition of NTG.
