= Grammarly =

American software assisting English writing

- Logo since 2024
- Original authors: Alex Shevchenko, Max Lytvyn, and Dmytro Lider
- Developer: Superhuman Platform Inc.
- Release: July 1, 2009; 17 years ago
- Operating system: Windows, macOS, Linux, Android, iOS, various web browsers
- Available in: American English; British English; Canadian English; Australian English; Indian English
- Type: Online text editor, browser extension, and mobile app with grammar checker, spell checker, and plagiarism detector
- License: Proprietary software
- Website: grammarly.com

Grammarly is an American English-language writing assistant software tool. It started as a tool to review the spelling, grammar, and tone of a piece of writing and to identify possible instances of plagiarism. Since 2025, it has integrated extensive generative AI tools, including options to generate essays from scratch, to suggest and insert citations, to "humanize" the text to avoid it being flagged as AI-generated, and to predict grades based on user input on the instructor, course, and university. It can also make stylistic and tonal recommendations. An "Expert review" feature, which attributed Grammarly's editing suggestions to subject-matter experts in various fields, was discontinued in March 2026 due to criticism and complaints.

Grammarly was developed in Ukraine and launched in 2009 by Alex Shevchenko, Max Lytvyn, and Dmytro Lider. In 2024 Grammarly bought Coda, and Coda CEO Shishir Mehrotra became Grammarly's CEO. After buying Superhuman in 2025, Grammarly rebranded its parent company as Superhuman and integrated more generative AI tools in the product. Grammarly is now developed by Superhuman Platform Inc., which is headquartered in San Francisco and has offices in Kyiv, New York, and Vancouver. It is available as a standalone application; a browser extension for Chrome, Safari, and Firefox; and as an add-on for Google Docs.

== History ==
Grammarly was founded in 2009 by Max Lytvyn, Alex Shevchenko, and Dmytro Lider. The company initially offered a subscription-based product intended to help students improve their grammar and spelling. That product was subsequently developed into a writing assistant that checks the grammar, spelling, and tone of a piece of writing.

By 2015, Grammarly had a million active daily users, and began offering its flagship product via a freemium model that allowed all users access to the product's basic capabilities while placing more sophisticated features like style recommendations and plagiarism detection behind a paywall. It also launched a browser extension for Chrome, Safari, and Firefox, as well as an add-on for Google Docs.

In 2019, Grammarly added a tone detector to its writing assistant. This tool uses set rules and machine learning to help users gauge the character of their writing and tailor it to a particular audience. Also in 2019, the company held a second funding round, raising $90 million. In 2020, Grammarly made its first investment in an outside company, participating in a $10 million funding round for Docugami, a company working on AI-driven document generation.

After the 2022 Russian invasion of Ukraine, Grammarly ceased all business operations in Russia and Belarus. It also continued to pay the salaries of Ukrainians who left their jobs at Grammarly to join the nation's army.

In April 2023, Grammarly launched a product using generative AI built on the GPT-3 large language models. In September 2024, Grammarly announced the release of its Authorship tool, which attempts to identify the source of a passage of text. It then designates the passage as written by the text's author, lifted from another source, or generated by AI. It is not clear to what extent such tools work.

In December 2024, Grammarly announced that it was acquiring the productivity startup Coda. As part of the deal, Coda CEO Shishir Mehrotra replaced Rahul Roy-Chowdhury as Grammarly's CEO.

2025 saw major changes in Grammarly's funding, leadership, and product. In May, Grammarly announced it raised $1 billion in nondilutive funding from General Catalyst. In July, Grammarly announced that it was acquiring the email client Superhuman. In October, Grammarly's parent company, Grammarly Inc., announced a rebrand to the Superhuman brand.

In March 2026, Grammarly faced complaints and criticism in response to an AI-powered feature called "Expert Review", which offered writing advice from simulations of actual living and deceased authors without contacting them or getting their permission. Launched in August 2025 as part of a suite of AI-powered features, the tool's featured authors included Stephen King, Neil deGrasse Tyson, Carl Sagan, and bell hooks. On March 11, 2026, the same day that journalist Julia Angwin filed a federal class-action lawsuit against the company, Superhuman announced that it was discontinuing the feature.

== Vulnerabilities ==
In early 2018, Tavis Ormandy, a security researcher at Google who was formerly part of Google's Project Zero team, discovered a severe vulnerability in Grammarly's browser extension that exposed authentication tokens to websites and could allow them to access the users' documents and other data. A few hours later, the company released a hotfix and reported that it found no evidence of compromised user data. This vulnerability was registered as CVE-2018-6654 in the Common Vulnerabilities and Exposures database. In December 2018, Grammarly launched a bug bounty program on HackerOne, offering a $100,000 reward to the first white hat hacker to access a specific document on the company's server.

== Reception ==
Reviewers have praised Grammarly's ease of use and helpful suggestions, finding it worthwhile despite its relatively high price and lack of offline functionality. Conversely, some users have criticized Grammarly for incorrect suggestions, ignorance of tone and context, and reduction of writers' freedom of expression.

Documents that Grammarly has corrected have occasionally been accused by detection engines such as Turnitin of being partially or entirely AI-generated. Schools are struggling to develop consistent and fair rules for its use, with some teachers recommending Grammarly to their students and others rejecting it.

== Superhuman Platform Inc. ==
Superhuman Platform Inc.
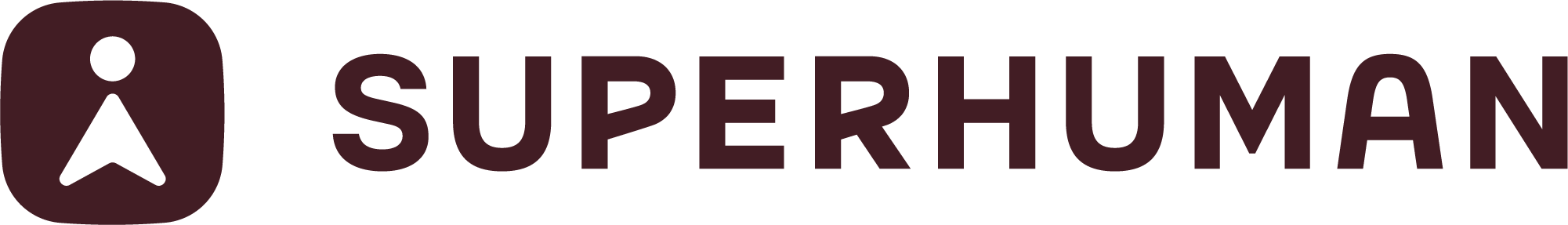
- Formerly: Grammarly Inc.
- Type: Private
- Industry: AI, productivity software, SaaS
- Founded: 2009
- Founders: Alex Shevchenko, Max Lytvyn, and Dmytro Lider
- Headquarters: San Francisco, California
- Key people: Shishir Mehrotra (CEO)
- Website: superhuman.com

Grammarly is developed by Superhuman Platform Inc., a technology company that also develops productivity, AI, and SaaS products such as Superhuman Mail, Coda, and Superhuman Go. The company assumed its current form in 2025, when Grammarly Inc., which was founded in 2009, acquired Superhuman Mail and Coda and rebranded itself as Superhuman. The company is headquartered in San Francisco, California and led by CEO Shishir Mehrotra.

In February 2026, Superhuman announced the acquisition of Rows, a company that uses AI to manage data and spreadsheets. Superhuman said that it would use Rows to improve the capabilities of Coda.

== Investments ==
As of May 2017, Grammarly had raised over $110 million in a public funding round, surpassing all previous Ukrainian startups. In 2019, the company raised $90 million in investment and was valued at over $1 billion. The total amount of investment raised in 2019 was $200 million.

On 13 May 2020, Grammarly announced its first investment in the Seattle-based start-up Docugami. The investment was made as part of the company's seed funding round.

In November 2021, the company announced that it had raised a new round of investment worth $200 million at a total valuation of $13 billion. New investors included Baillie Gifford and funds and accounts managed by BlackRock.

In May 2025, Grammarly announced that it had raised $1 billion in growth funding from the CVF fund General Catalyst.

In July 2025, Grammarly announced the acquisition of the email client Superhuman.

In October 2025, Grammarly's parent company, Grammarly Inc., announced a rebranding under the Superhuman brand and unveiled a new AI-powered assistant designed not only to correct text but also to boost productivity and support communication..

== See also ==
- Google Docs § History
- LanguageTool
