= JTB Corporation =

Travel agency in Japan

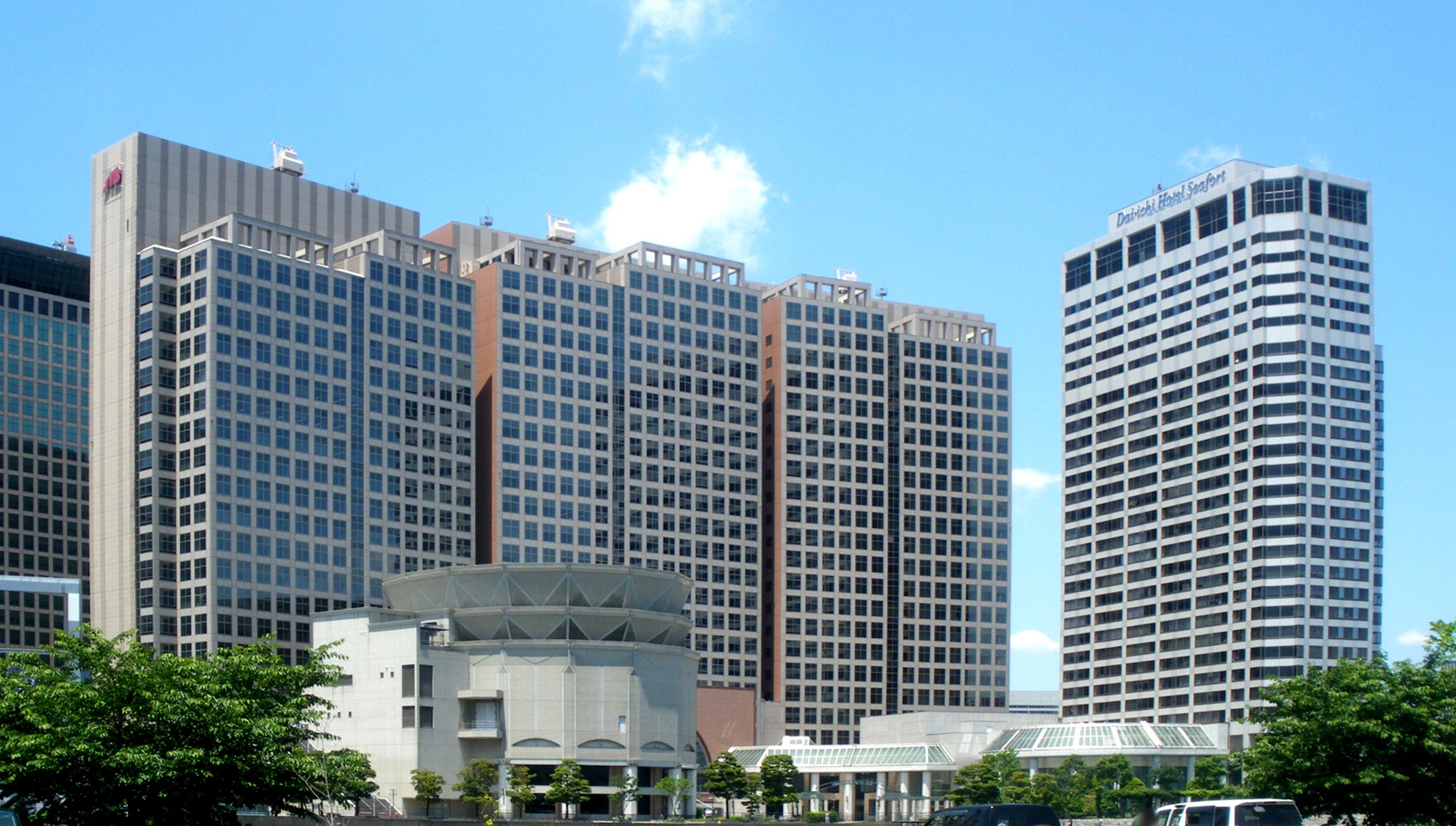
- Headquarters in Seafort Square (Left), Tennōzu Isle, Tokyo, Japan
- Native name: 株式会社JTB
- Romanized name: Kabushiki Gaisha JeīTīBī
- Type: kabushiki gaisha
- Industry: service sector
- Genre: Travel agency, publishing company
- Founded: November 22, 1963; 62 years ago in Tokyo, Japan
- Headquarters: JTB Building; 2-3-11 Higashi-Shinagawa, Shinagawa-ku; 35°37′25″N 139°45′03″E, Tokyo, Japan
- Key people: Eijirō Yamakita（Representative director, President） 花坂隆之 (Representative director, 執行役員); Hiroyuki Takahashi (Former Representative director)
- Revenue: 582.323 billion (March 2022)
- Operating income: 17.62 billion (March 2022)
- Net income: 28.46 (March 2022)
- Total assets: 709.487 billion (March 2022)
- Total equity: 109.22 billion (March 2022)
- Number of employees: 19,053 (September 2023)
- Website: Official website
- Footnotes; Recorded number of Japan Tourism Agency: 64

JTB Corporation (株式会社ジェイティービー, Kabushiki Gaisha Jeitībī) is the largest travel agency in Japan and one of the largest travel agencies in the world. It specializes in tourism. There are branches all over the world to help Japanese and non-Japanese guests in both private leisure and corporate / business fields. It was formerly owned by the Japanese government. It is headquartered in the JTB Building in Shinagawa, Tokyo. Due to COVID-19, JTB planned to reduce its group headcount by 7,200 and close 115 domestic outlets by September 2021.

== History ==
The company was established as "Japan Tourist Bureau (ジャパンツーリストビューロー, Japan Tsūrisuto Byūrō)" in 1912, primarily serving foreign visitors to Japan. In 1941, the company was renamed as East Asian Travel Agent (東亜旅行社, Tōa Ryokōsha), and in the following year changed its status from corporation to foundation, while still retaining its travel agency functions. After World War II, the company was renamed as "Japan Travel Bureau (日本交通公社, Nihon Kōtsū Kōsha)". In 1963, Japan Travel Bureau was divided into two separate entities, with the travel agency arm becoming an independent corporation while the foundation remained a non-profit organization. However, both organizations retained the Japan Travel Bureau banner. On 1 January 2001, the corporation was renamed "JTB Corporation", while the foundation retained the Japan Travel Bureau name. In 1997, its operations began.

The original JTB company, "JTB Corporation", has since diversified into other businesses including pharmaceuticals, financial services, consumer goods, publishing, telecommunications and more. The entity that operates its flagship travel business is JTBGMT which supplies tours and other Japan Travel products directly to customers and to travel agents under its "Sunrise Tour" brand. The publishing arm of JTB Corp. produces the popular "Rurubu" magazine which, in 2010, was recognised by the Guinness Book of World Records as most widely-sold travel guide series in the world. The company also publishes the Japan in Your Pocket series of tourist guide mini-books.

== See also ==
- Northstar Travel Group
- H.I.S. (travel agency)
