= List of ISO romanizations =

List of ISO standards for transliterations and romanizations:

== Romanizations ==
- ISO 3602:1989 (Romanization of Japanese (kana script))
- ISO 7098:2015 (Romanization of Chinese)

== Transliterations ==
- ISO 9:1995 (Transliteration of Cyrillic characters into Latin characters — Slavic and non-Slavic languages)
- ISO 233:1984 (Transliteration of Arabic characters into Latin characters)
  - ISO 233-2:1993 (Transliteration of Arabic characters into Latin characters — Part 2: Arabic language — Simplified transliteration)
  - ISO 233-3:2023 (Transliteration of Arabic characters into Latin characters — Part 3: Persian language — Transliteration)
- ISO 259:1984 (Transliteration of Hebrew characters into Latin characters)
  - ISO 259-2:1994 (Transliteration of Hebrew characters into Latin characters — Part 2: Simplified transliteration)
- ISO 843:1997 (Conversion of Greek characters into Latin characters)
- ISO 9984:2026 (Transliteration of Georgian characters into Latin characters)
- ISO 9985:2026 (Transliteration of Armenian characters into Latin characters)
- ISO 11940:1998 (Transliteration of Thai)
  - ISO 11940-2:2007 (Transliteration of Thai characters into Latin characters — Part 2: Simplified transcription of Thai language)
- ISO 15919:2001 (Transliteration of Devanagari and related Indic scripts into Latin characters)
- ISO 20674-1:2019 (Transliteration of scripts in use in Thailand — Part 1: Transliteration of Akson-Thai-Noi)

== Withdrawn ==
- ISO/TR 11941:1996 (Transliteration of Korean script into Latin characters, withdrawn in 2013)

== See also ==
- ISO 15924:2022 (Codes for the representation of names of scripts)
- List of ISO standards
