= Actionstep =

Legal practice management software

- Type: Private
- Industry: Cloud Software
- Founded: New Zealand (2004)
- Headquarters: Auckland, New Zealand
- Number of locations: 4 Global Offices
- Key people: Early Stephens (CEO)
- Website: www.actionstep.com

Actionstep is a cloud-based legal practice management software for law firms and compliance-focused businesses. Actionstep is built to be a comprehensive practice management software with features for workflow automation as well as automatic document generation

== History ==
Actionstep was created by Ted Jordan, CEO of Actionstep, in 2004. It was first used commercially in 2005 by a New Zealand construction franchise as well as a law firm. Actionstep soon expanded into central government and a wider range of small business users (mainly in New Zealand and Australia).

After a few years the expanse of their legal client base prompted the company to add key legal specific features to the product with the aim of further expanding their legal market.

Through Actionstep's tenure as a practice management software they have gradually expanded from their headquarters in New Zealand and offices located in the United Kingdom and the United States of America.

In October 2020, private equity firm Serent Capital Partners purchased 84.25% stake in Actionstep.

In April 2022, the company announced unlimited annual leave to its staff

== Product ==
The premise of Actionstep is that it saves companies from having to purchase software tailored to their work flow and instead allows companies to modify the program without additional coding. The founder and CEO Ted Jordan used cloud technology to allow the software to be continuously updated without the need to purchase or redesign new software. This theoretically allows businesses to remain current all the time and cut external I.T. costs.

Actionstep also integrates with software from other companies, such as Xero accounting, Microsoft Office & Office 365, Gmail, Google Drive, Dropbox, NetDocuments, QuickBooks, LawPay, BundleDocs, Box, HotDocs, Infotrack, GlobalX, PEXA, JOSEF and Zapier.

Actionstep contains workflow automation features aimed at increasing office efficiency. These automated processes include automatic task assignment, information collection, document generation & automation, cataloguing, and matter generation.

== Awards ==
Actionstep was named First International Best of SaaS Showplace Award Winner in 2009. Actionstep has also been a finalist in the ComputerWorld Excellence Awards (2007), and the Vero Excellence in Business Support (2010).
