= BonPatron =

French online spelling and grammar checker

- Original authors: Terry Nadasdi & Stéfan Sinclair
- Developer: Nadaclair Language Technologies Inc.
- Initial release: 2001
- Stable release: 2018
- Operating system: Cross-platform
- Available in: 3 languages
- Type: Spell checker, grammar checker
- Website: bonpatron.com

BonPatron is a French online spelling and grammar checker, developed by Nadaclair Language Technologies. The site includes guides for grammar, vocabulary, phonetics, and a verb conjugator.

== History ==
BonPatron was created as an academic project in 2001 by Terry Nadasdi (University of Alberta) and Stéfan Sinclair (McGill University). BonPatron initially targeted grammatical errors typically made by anglophone learners of French. Its purpose was to see how closely a web-based grammar checker could replicate what teachers do when correcting student compositions (repeatedly indicating the same mistakes). BonPatron was initially called LePatron but changed its name in 2007 when it became a joint academic/commercial endeavour.

The site was initially designed for language learners in North America, but it is now used extensively by people whose first language is French, especially in France and Quebec.

In addition to the main grammar checker, other pedagogical resources have been added over the years (e.g.: a grammar guide, a vocabulary guide and a phonetics guide).

== Usage ==
BonPatron has two versions, one that is free and supported by ads (bonpatron.com) and the other that is subscription-based (pro.bonpatron.com). Both draw on the same error database to identify and explain errors. The main difference is that the subscription-based version accepts longer texts. Native mobile apps are available for iOS and Android, developed in partnership with Alkeo.

In order to use BonPatron, the user supplies a text (typed or pasted from the clipboard) and hits the “Check” button. After doing so, the text is examined for typical errors. Errors will be flagged and relevant feedback will be displayed. BonPatron does not provide automatic correction. Rather, it supplies information to help the learner learn from the mistake. It is in this sense that BonPatron should be viewed as an interactive pedagogical tool rather than an editor or traditional grammar checker.

The BonPatron website averages 4.5 million unique visitors annually and processes an average of 250,000 texts per day.

== Research and evaluation ==
BonPatron has been reviewed and evaluated by a number of scholars. The main findings from these evaluations are: a) BonPatron is able to identify approximately 90% of errors typical of learners writing in French; b) BonPatron stands apart from other grammar checkers because of its pedagogical design; c) BonPatron promotes learning and its use leads to a reduced number of errors in learner texts.
