= Reference Software International =

American software developer

- Type: Private
- Founded: 1985; 41 years ago in Walnut Creek, California, United States
- Founders: Donald Emery; Bruce Wampler
- Defunct: 1993; 33 years ago
- Fate: Acquired by WordPerfect Corporation
- Headquarters: Albuquerque, New Mexico (research and development)
- Products: Grammatik
- Number of employees: 140 (1992, peak)

Reference Software International, Inc. (RSI), was an American software developer active from 1985 to 1993 and based in Albuquerque, New Mexico, and San Francisco, California. The company released several productivity and reference software packages, including the Grammatik grammar checker, for MS-DOS. The company was acquired by WordPerfect Corporation in 1993.

== History ==
=== Background (1980–1985) ===
Reference Software International, Inc., was founded by Donald "Don" Emery and Bruce Wampler in 1985 in San Francisco, California. Both Wampler and Emery were college professors when they founded RSI: Wampler at the University of New Mexico as a professor of computer science and Emery a professor of marketing at San Francisco State University. After graduating from the University of Utah in around 1978, Wampler founded his first software company, Aspen Software, in Tijeras, New Mexico, in 1979. Wampler founded Aspen to develop an early spell checker software package, called Proofreader, for the TRS-80, licensing Random House's Webster's Unabridged Dictionary for the package's lexicon. In 1980, he began development on a grammar checker inspired by Writer's Workbench, a pioneering grammar checker for Unix systems. Wampler used Writer's Workbench heavily during the writer of his doctoral dissertation but disliked having to jump between the Apple II on which he composed the dissertation and the mainframe on which Writer's Workbench ran, and so wanted to develop a version of the latter for microcomputers.

Wampler's work came to fruition as Grammatik in 1981, eventually ported to several other microcomputer platforms in the early 1980s. In 1983, by which point the company had 12 employees and sold a combined 80,000 units of Grammatik and Proofreader, Wampler sold Aspen to Dictronics, a software company best known for developing the Electronic Thesaurus, an early thesaurus program for microcomputers.

Dictronics was in turn purchased by Wang Laboratories; according to Wampler, "Wang bought [Aspen] and sat on it. They did nothing with it". Wampler moved on to teach for the University of New Mexico, but, frustrated by Wang's inaction, got the urge to resurrect his work. In 1985, he was able to license back Grammatik and Proofreader from a small California-based software firm that had grandfathered rights to a forked version of both. In the same year, he met Emery, who, impressed by Wampler's, founded Reference Software International to market his software. RSI's research and development headquarters were based in Albuquerque, while the company's sales and marketing department was based in Walnut Creek, California.

=== Success (1985–1992) ===
In August 1985, RSI released their first product: the Random House Reference Set, a new version of Proofreader for the IBM Personal Computer and compatibles, revised to be a terminate-and-stay-resident program that ran atop other word processors such as WordStar or WordPerfect. At the time, Reference Set was the only such program on the market that functioned like this. RSI netted $114,000 from sales of Reference Set by the end of 1985. In June 1986, they released version 2.0 of Grammatik as Grammatik II for the PC. The latter was a breakout hit for RSI, receiving praise in the press (including technology journals such as PC Magazine) and RSI selling 1,000 units a month. In spring 1987, they released Reference Set II, which allowed users to import their own words into the built-in dictionary and added a thesaurus of 300,000 words. In November 1987, they released version 3.0 of Reference Set, which comprised two new field-specific dictionaries for the medical and legal professions. As well as the general Random House dictionary and thesaurus, it included Stedman's Medical Dictionary and Black's Law Dictionary. Emery consulted Paul Brest and Bob Jackson—professors of law at Stanford Law School and San Francisco State respectively—for the curation of the law dictionary; and Burton Grebin—at the time the executive director of Mount Saint Mary's Hospital—for the curation of the medical dictionary.

In fall 1988, the company released Grammatik III, a total rewrite that made use of artificial intelligence to more accurately judge the grammar of sentences by breaking them down into a syntactic hierarchy. Grammatik III received universal acclaim, with Gloria Morris of InfoWorld calling it the apparent leader in the grammar checking field and Sandra Anderson of Mac Home Journal calling it "hands down ... the best of the industry" six years after its release. By 1989, the product had competitors in Correct Grammar by Lifetree Software and RightWriter by Rightsoft, Inc.

By 1990, RSI achieved annual sales of $9.7 million. In the same year they released Grammatik IV, which was the first to offer direct integration with WordPerfect on both MS-DOS and Windows. In March 1992—by which point RSI had sold 1.5 million copies of Grammatik across all versions—the company released version 5 of the program, another rewrite that updated the lexicon further and added new functions such as word redundancy detection. Around the same time, the company introduced Easy Proof, a pared-down version of Grammatik intended for novice writers, students, and family computers.

In 1991, the company was engaged in a trademark dispute with Systems Compatibility Corporation (SCC) of Chicago, Illinois, over the rights to the Software Toolkit title. Both companies had published software bundles bearing the name in the turn of the 1990s; SCC had published theirs first in 1988 and registered the trademark with the USPTO. SCC was granted a restraining order against RSI in January 1991. The following month, RSI agreed to rename their product, preventing a protracted legal battle.

=== Decline and acquisition (1992–1993) ===
By early 1992, RSI achieved annual sales of more than $13 million, employed 120 people, and had opened international offices in London, Belgium, and Antwerp to sell foreign versions of Reference Set and Grammatik. The company reached peak employment in the middle of 1992, with 140 employees. However, RSI's launch of six disparate titles in the year proved problematic for the company when they failed to sell as well as they had projected, and the company laid off employees by the dozens. By December 1992, only 71 employees were left, 32 from their San Francisco office. On the last day of 1992, RSI received an acquisition offer from WordPerfect Corporation, makers of the namesake word processor based in Orem, Utah. The deal was inked in January 1993, RSI's stakeholders receiving $19 million. The company's remaining employees were absorbed into WordPerfect in Orem. WordPerfect continued selling Grammatik as a standalone product for several years.
