= Writer's Workbench =

Software program

- Original authors: Lorinda Cherry, Nina Macdonald
- Developer: AT&T Bell Laboratories
- Operating system: Unix
- Available in: English
- Type: Grammar checker

The Writer's Workbench (wwb) is a grammar checker created by Lorinda Cherry and Nina Macdonald of Bell Labs. It is perhaps the earliest grammar checker to receive wide usage on Unix systems.

== Capabilities ==
wwb's utilities were capable of analysing text for parts of speech, and for word and sentence length, and of comparing the results to established norms.

The Writer's Workbench was meant to help students learn to edit their work:

My feeling about a lot of those tools is their value in education is as much pointing out to people who are learning to write that they have choices and make choices when they do it. They don't think of a writing task as making choices per se. Once they get it on paper they think it's cast in stone. So it makes them edit.

Polling at Colorado State University in the 1980s indicated that wwb was well received by students and faculty. Additional analysis in the 1980s indicated close correlation between wwb's assessments and essay grading rubrics.

== Package contents ==
As of 1983, the wwb package contained 29 utilities. As of 1986, this had increased to around 35–40 utilities:

Command	Description
abst	Analyzes documents for abstractness.
acro	Finds acronyms in text files.
conscap	Identifies inconsistent capitalization.
consist	Identifies inaccuracies in trademarks and inconsistent capitalization between British English and American English.
conspell	Identifies inconsistent use of British and American spelling.
continge	Analyzes text for contingencies in procedural documents.
continrls	Presents information about how contingencies can be displayed as if-then lists or decision trees.
dictadd	Adds words to the dictionaries used by diction, sexist, spellwwb and tmark.
diction	Identifies wordy sentences and suggests how they may be simplified.
diversity	Analyzes word frequencies to provide a measure of the number of distinct words, and generates an output file ranking how often particular words occurred.
double	Identifies accidental repeated occurrences of the same word, such as "the the" or "and and".
findbe	Identifies uses of the verb "to be" (see E-Prime).
gram	Identifies misused articles and split infinitives.
match	Compares outputs from the style command to statistically compare writing styles between documents.
mkstand	Analyzes a "well-written" document to generate a standard for use by the prose command.
morestyle	Analyzes text by running the abst, diversity, neg and topic commands.
murky	Analyzes procedural documents to identify difficult sentences.
neg	Identifies negations in text.
org	Processes documents to produce condensed versions that show the document's organization.
parts	Analyzes documents to assign parts of speech to each word.
proofr	Invokes the spellwwb, punct, double, diction and gram commands to perform automatic proofreading.
proofvi	Invokes the spellwwb, punct, double and diction commands to provide interactive error correction.
prose	Describes the writing style of a document.
prosestnd	Displays the standards used by the prose command.
punct	Checks punctuation of documents.
punctrls	Displays punctuation rules.
reroff	Converts formatted text into nroff format.
sexist	Identifies sexist terms and suggests alternatives.
spelladd	Adds words to the personal dictionary used by spellwwb.
spelltell	Finds the correct spelling of a word.
spellwbb	Enhanced version of the spell command that can process multiple files.
splitrls	Displays information about split infinitives.
style	Analyzes style characteristics of documents.
switchr	Analyzes documents to identify words used as both nouns and verbs.
syl	Analyzes documents to produce a list of every word used along with the number of syllables of each word.
tmark	Identifies incorrectly used trademarks.
tmarkrls	Displays information about rules for the correct use of trademarks.
topic	Lists the most frequent nouns in a document to give some idea about its topic.
worduse	Displays information about correct use of words and phrases.
wwb	Invokes the proofr and prose commands to provide a complete report on a document and suggested improvements.
wwbaid	Online help system for the Writer's Workbench.
wwbhelp	Searches for help on a particular Writer's Workbench topic.
wwbinfo	Displays a complete summary of the Writer's Workbench suite.

== History and successors ==
The wwb package was included with AT&T UNIX in the late 1970s and early 1980s and received wide distribution as a result. However, wwb was not included with Version 7 Unix. Various successors arose, based closely upon wwb, such as the commercial Grammatik packages for IBM PCs.

The GNU operating system contains free software implementations of several wwb utilities, such as spell, style and diction. As of early 2019, the look utility had not yet been ported to GNU, but its implementation from 4.4BSD-Lite is available as free software, for example via Debian.

== See also ==
- LanguageTool
- Programmer's Workbench (PWB/UNIX)

== Bibliography ==
- Costanzo, William V. (1989). The Electronic Text: Learning to Write, Read, and Reason with Computers. Educational Technology Publications. p. 129. ISBN 9780877782087. "writer's workbench."
- Dale, Robert; Moisl, Hermann; Somers, Harold (2000). Handbook of Natural Language Processing. CRC Press. ISBN 9780824790004.
- Gehani, Narain (1987). Document Formatting and Typesetting on the UNIX System, Volume 1. Silicon Press. ISBN 9780961533625.
- InfoWorld (1983-12-26). "UNIX applications for micros nearing the market". InfoWorld: The Newspaper for the Microcomputing Community. 5 (52).
- Pfaffenberger, Bryan (1987). Personal Computer Applications: A Strategy for the Information Society. Little, Brown. ISBN 9780316704021.
- Raskin, Robin (1986-05-27). "Writer's Workbench: the Grandaddy of Style". PC Mag.
