= NetDocuments =

Cloud document and email management service

- Type: Private
- Industry: Content Management, Software as a service
- Founded: 1999; 27 years ago
- Founder: Kenneth Duncan; Alvin Tedjamulia; Lee Duncan
- Headquarters: Lehi, Utah, USA with offices in Wokingham (London) and Sydney
- Area served: Global
- Key people: Josh Baxter (CEO)
- Products: Document management, Email management
- Website: www.netdocuments.com

NetDocuments is a cloud-based document, email, and records management service.

NetDocuments was launched in 1999 to sell enterprise applications under the software as a service (SaaS) business model. Its functionality is accessible through a web browser.

== History ==
Established in 1999, NetDocuments is a web-based document and email management service delivered through SaaS. The founders of NetDocuments include the same team that developed SoftSolutions in the 1980s before it was acquired by WordPerfect in late 1993.

The company was founded by brothers Kenneth Duncan and Lee Duncan, and Alvin Tedjamulia. Kenneth Duncan served as CEO until 2014. NetDocuments is Ken Duncan's second document management company after having founded SoftSolutions in the late 1980s. SoftSolutions was sold to WordPerfect in 1994. WordPerfect was subsequently sold to Novell, which did not continue the SoftSolutions document management system but did, however, use the SoftSolutions technology in its GroupWise offering.

In August 2006, NetDocuments developed an integration with Salesforce.com.

In March 2008, NetDocuments embedded Fast Search and Transfer of Microsoft into its service to expand its search functionality.

In July 2014, Frontier Capital announced a $25 million investment into NetDocuments, taking a majority equity position, without disclosing the exact size of the majority.

In August 2014, Matt Duncan was appointed CEO, replacing his father, Kenneth Duncan.

In August 2015, NetDocuments announced a new strategic partnership with Microsoft, integrating the two companies’ cloud technologies, including an integration of Microsoft Office 365 online web apps with NetDocuments global cloud storage.

In March 2017, Clearlake Capital's acquisition of Frontier Capital's position in NetDocuments was finalized. While the parties did not disclose the terms of the deal, AGC Partners quotes a size of $220 Million.

In July 2018, Josh Baxter was appointed as the new CEO, replacing Matt Duncan.

In May 2019, Boston headquartered Cove Hill Partners acquired a stake in NetDocuments from Clearlake Capital's equity position.

In May 2021, Warburg Pincus acquired Clearlake Capital's interest in NetDocuments, joining Cove Hill as joint owners of the company. Legal IT Insider reported that NetDocuments was valued at $1.4 Billion in the deal, but NetDocuments declined to comment on that figure.

In 2021, the company was chosen by the United States Attorney’s office as their cloud-management platform.

In 2022, the company released PatternBuilder, a "no-code document and workflow automation tool."

== Partnerships & acquisitions ==
In 2006, NetDocuments moved its primary data center to the LexisNexis headquarters and formed a distribution partnership with LexisNexis. NetDocuments ended their LexisNexis distribution partnership in 2009 but continued to use the LexisNexis data center as its primary data center until 2011, when it relocated to Arizona. Its secondary data center resides at Zions Bancorporation.

In January 2015, the company announced its acquisition of Recommind’s Decisiv search and enterprise email management system. The product was renamed to NetDocuments EM.

NetDocuments announced in November 2021 that it acquired Afterpattern, a no-code automation toolkit for legal professionals.

In October 2022, the company acquired Worldox, a document management solutions company.

On October 3, 2025, NetDocuments announced its acquisition of eDOCS, a competitor, from Canadian software company OpenText.
