= Autocorrection =

Feature on word processors to automatically correct misspelled words

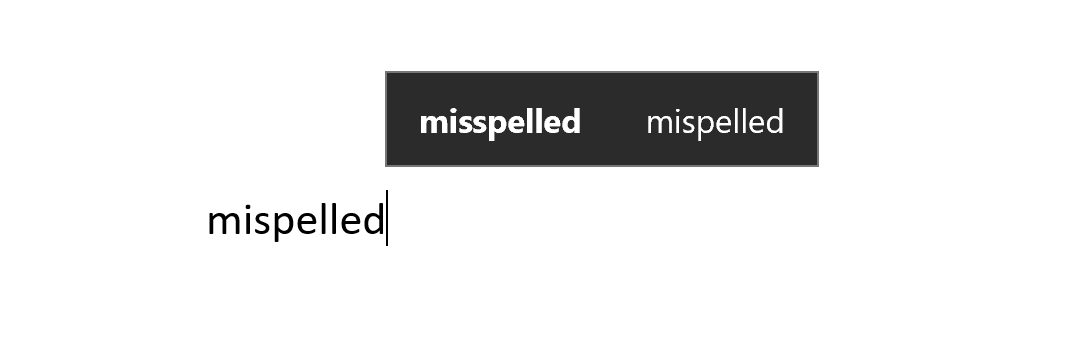
Autocorrect in Windows 10, correcting the word "mispelled" to "misspelled".

Autocorrection, also known as text replacement, replace-as-you-type, text expander or simply autocorrect, is an automatic data validation function commonly found in word processors and text editing interfaces for smartphones and tablet computers. Its principal purpose is as part of the spell checker to correct common spelling or typing errors, saving time for the user. It is also used to automatically format text or insert special characters by recognizing particular character usage, saving the user from having to use more tedious functions. Autocorrection is used in text messaging or SMS, as well as programs like Microsoft Word.

== Use ==
In word processing, this feature is known as AutoCorrect. In the beginning, autotext definitions for common typos or well-known acronyms were created by other providers; today's office packages usually already contain the function. On the Mac, starting with Mac OS X Snow Leopard 10.6, this functionality is also provided by the operating system.

One of the first autocorrect programs was Ways for Windows by Hannes Keller. JavaScript can be used on websites to provide the user with autotext.

Autocorrect is pre-installed on many instant messaging programs and virtual keyboards on cell phones, smartphones and tablet computers to enable faster and error-free typing.

== Disadvantages ==
Some writers and organizations choose to consistently replace some words with others as part of their editorial policy, with occasionally unforeseen results. For example, the American Family Association chose to replace all instances of the word "gay" on its website with the word "homosexual". This caused an article about US Olympic sprinter Tyson Gay to be littered with confusing sentences such as "In Saturday's opening heat, Homosexual pulled way up, way too soon, and nearly was caught by the field, before accelerating again and lunging in for fourth place".

Autocorrect also disproportionately perceives names of African and Asian origin as errors.

== Humour ==
Misuse of text replacement software is a staple practical joke in many schools and offices. Typically, the prankster will set the victim's word processing software to replace an extremely common word with a humorous absurdity, or an incorrectly spelled version of the original word. (Example: Replacing "groceries" with "geography" to get a sentence such as "I'm going to the store to buy some geography. I mean geography. Geography. Why can't I type geography?") The growing use of autocorrection on smartphones has also led to the creation of at least one website, Damn You Auto Correct, where people post and share humorous or embarrassing cases of improper autocorrections. Damn You Auto Correct was started in 2010 by Jillian Madison. It is also the name of a book Madison wrote that was published in 2011 by Hyperion Books. The website and the book both compile texts sent on iPhones and Android phones that were altered by the phone's autocorrection feature to produce what are often unintentionally funny messages. Within a week of its launch, the website had collected hundreds of submissions and had attracted about one million page views. However, at the end of November 2018, the website went defunct.

== See also ==
- Approximate string matching
- Predictive text
- LanguageTool
- Autocomplete
- Code completion
