= SoftSolutions =

SoftSolutions Technology Corporation
- Type: Private
- Industry: Document management system, Legal technology, Software
- Founded: 1979
- Founders: Kenneth Duncan; Alvin Tedjamulia; Lee Duncan
- Fate: Acquired
- Headquarters: Orem, Utah, U.S.A.
- Products: SoftSolutions document management software
- Parent: WordPerfect (1993)

SoftSolutions was an early document management system (or DMS), which was used primarily by law firms.

== History ==
It was founded in 1979 by Ken Duncan, along with co-founders Alvin Tedjamulia and Lee Duncan. It was a notable early software player in the Silicon Slopes technology region.

In 1988, the company moved from a basement office on State Street in Orem, UT to a newly built corporate facility at 625 S. State Street in Orem, encompassing 14,000 square feet to accommodate its then 45 employees and allow room for further expansion.

In late 1993, when sources claim SoftSolutions had achieved 54% marketshare of the Document management market, it was purchased by WordPerfect, which was subsequently acquired by Novell in 1994. SoftSolutions and WordPerfect were later incorporated into NetWare 4.1. SoftSolutions was subsequently terminated as a product, but its features were ultimately included in Novell's GroupWise product in 1998.

At the time of its acquisition by WordPerfect/Novell in 1993, Y2K fears had begun to escalate. However, Novell stopped developing the SoftSolutions product in the 90s, so it was never fully brought into compliance with the Y2K standards needed later that decade. Just prior to the turn of the century, many law firms and organizations were still using SoftSolutions, necessitating a change to a newer DMS.

The original founders of SoftSolutions later went on to establish another Utah company, NetDocuments, which also serviced the legal industry.
