= World Software Corporation =

- Type: Privately-Held Company
- Industry: Information Technology
- Founded: 1988; 38 years ago
- Headquarters: Glen Rock, New Jersey, United States
- Area served: Worldwide
- Key people: Tom Burke CEO and Chairman, Kristina Burke Vice Chairwoman and Secretary, Ray Zwiefelhofer President
- Products: Document Management, SaaS
- Website: www.worldox.com

World Software Corporation is an American software company that is the creator and distributor of Worldox, a Document Management System. As of 2018, World Software Corporation had over 6,000 customers in 52 countries and 200 resellers, 5,200 customer installations with 4,800 being law firms, legal departments and legal organizations, 300 financial services firms and 100 in other industries.

== History ==
World Software Corporation was founded in New Jersey in 1988 by Tom Burke and Kristina Burke.

By 2018, World Software and Worldox technology had established and maintained a single, dedicated product and corporate focus of a Legal Document Management System over these 30 years.

Worldox technology synchronizes the Cloud, Mobile, internet (browser) and Microsoft Windows environments by providing the core requirement of a cross-platform digital filing system for documents, emails, and objects (aka unstructured data).

In 2022, NetDocuments acquired Worldox.

== Products ==
Years	Category	#Products	Product Names
1988 to 1993	MS-DOS	4	Extend-A-Name, Extend-A-Name Plus, Extend-A-File, Extend-A-File Plus
1993 to 2015	MS-Windows	13	Worldox - 1, 2, 2.1, 96, 8, 2000, 2002, 2004, GX, GX1, GX2, GX3 Pro, GX4 Pro
1999 to 2011	Internet	3	Worldox/Web, Worldox Web/Mobile., "Hosted" Worldox Web/Mobile
2010 to 2015	Cloud	3	Worldox CompleteCloud, Worldox GX3 Cloud, Worldox GX4 Cloud.
2012 to 2015	Mobile	2	Worldox GX3 Enterprise, Worldox GX4 Enterprise
2010 to 2014	Apple Corp	2+	Apple iPad, Worldox for Mac, (+)Apple iPhone via Worldox Web Mobile.
2010 to 2015	Add-Ons	3	Worldox Connectors (18) products, Worldox Applets (10) products, Worldox Productivity Suite
2013 to 2015	Integrations	3	Sony Digital Paper, Canon Scanners, Fujitsu Scanners

== Customers ==
Notable organizations using Worldox include:

- Law Firms
  - Jones Walker LLP
  - Eckert Seamans
  - Maynard, Cooper & Gale, P.C.
  - Sullivan & Worcester LLP
- Corporations:
  - Alcoa
  - Boise Cascade
  - Daimler Chrysler
  - Deutsche Bank
  - Hilton Hotels & Resorts
  - Pacific Gas and Electric Company
  - Pitney Bowes
  - Purolator Inc.
- Non-Profits and Non-Governmental Organizations:
  - The World Bank
  - Columbia University
  - New York University
  - Ohio State University
  - Princeton University
  - The Legal Aid Society of San Francisco
- Financial/Accounting Firms:
  - Citigroup
  - Crowe Horwath

== See also ==
- Cloud Computing
- Document Management System
- Software as a Service
