= Grammatik =

Grammar checker

Grammatik was the first grammar-checking program for home computers. Aspen Software of Albuquerque, NM, released the earliest version of this diction and style checker for personal computers. It was first released no later than 1981, and was inspired by the Writer's Workbench.

Grammatik was first available for the TRS-80, and soon had versions for CP/M and the IBM PC. Reference Software International of San Francisco, California, acquired Grammatik in 1985. Development of Grammatik continued, and it became an actual grammar checker that could detect writing errors beyond simple style checking.

Subsequent versions were released for MS-DOS, Windows, Macintosh, and Unix. Grammatik was ultimately acquired by WordPerfect Corporation and is integrated into the WordPerfect word processor.
