= WordPerfect =

Word processing application

- A document being edited in WordPerfect X3
- Original authors: Brigham Young University; Satellite Software International (SSI)
- Developers: WordPerfect Corporation; Novell; Corel
- Release: 1979; 47 years ago
- Stable release: 2021 / May 2021
- Operating system: Windows 7 and later Old versions: See § Version history
- Platform: IA-32
- Type: Word processor
- License: Proprietary
- Website: www.wordperfect.com/en/

WordPerfect Corporation
- Industry: Software
- Founded: 1979; 47 years ago in Orem, Utah
- Founders: Bruce Bastian; Alan C. Ashton
- Defunct: 1994; 32 years ago
- Fate: Sold to Novell; most assets in turn sold to Corel in 1996

WordPerfect (WP) is a word processing application, now owned by Corel. At the height of its popularity in the 1980s and early 1990s, it was the market leader of word processors, displacing the previous market leader, WordStar.

It was originally developed under contract at Brigham Young University for use on a Data General minicomputer in the late 1970s. The authors retained the rights to the program, forming the Utah-based Satellite Software International (SSI) in 1979 to sell it; the program first came to market under the name SSI*WP in March 1980. It was then ported to the MS-DOS operating system in 1982, by which time the name WordPerfect was in use, and several greatly updated versions quickly followed. The application's feature list was considerably more advanced than its main competition, WordStar. Satellite Software International changed its name to WordPerfect Corporation in 1985.

WordPerfect gained praise for its "look of sparseness" and clean display. It rapidly displaced most other systems, especially after the 4.2 release in 1986, and it became the standard in the DOS market by version 5.1 in 1989. Its early popularity was based partly on its superior functionality, availability for a wide variety of computers and operating systems, and also partly because of extensive, no-cost support (even eventually offering "hold jockeys" who entertained users while waiting on the phone).

Its dominant position ended approximately two to three years after the first release for Microsoft Windows; the company reported Microsoft did not initially share its Windows Application Programming Interface (API) specifications, causing the WordPerfect for Windows application to be slow. After WordPerfect received the Windows APIs, there was a long delay in reprogramming before introducing an improved version. Microsoft Word had been introduced at the same time as its first attempt, and while WordPerfect initially enjoyed the highest market share of word processors for Windows, in a matter of years, Word took over the market because it was faster, employed aggressive corporate sales contracts, and was promoted by aggressive bundling deals that ultimately produced Microsoft Office.

WordPerfect Corporation was sold to Novell in 1994, which then sold the product to Corel in 1996. WordPerfect was no longer a popular standard by the late '90s. Corel has made regular releases to the product since then, often in the form of office suites under the WordPerfect name that include the Quattro Pro spreadsheet, the Presentations slides formatter, and other applications.

The common filename extension of WordPerfect document files is .wpd. Older versions of WordPerfect also used file extensions .wp, .wp7, .wp6, .wp5, .wp4, and originally, no extension at all.

== WordPerfect for DOS ==
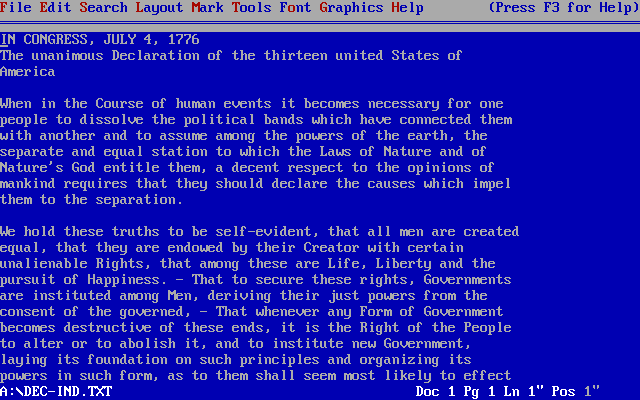
WordPerfect 5.1 for DOS

In 1979, Brigham Young University graduate student Bruce Bastian and computer science professor Alan Ashton created word processing software for a Data General minicomputer system owned by the city of Orem, Utah. Bastian and Ashton retained ownership of the software that they created, and founded Satellite Software International, Inc. (SSI) in 1980 to market the program to other Data General users.

WordPerfect 1.0 represented a significant departure from the previous Wang standard for word processing. By the end of the year SSI had 16 employees including W. E. "Pete" Peterson, hired as bookkeeper and office manager. Bastian worked as program manager while Ashton taught at BYU in the morning and worked on the software with his best students in the afternoon. Bastian and Ashton each owned 49.9% of the company, and Peterson—who became executive vice president, and actively managed the company—received 0.2% to break ties.

The first version of WordPerfect for the IBM PC was released the day after Thanksgiving in 1982. It was sold as WordPerfect 2.20, continuing the version numbering from the Data General program. SSI's sales that year were $1 million. Over the next several months, three more minor releases arrived, mainly to correct bugs.

The developers had hoped to program WordPerfect in C, but at this early stage, there were no C compilers available for the IBM PC, and they had to program it in x86 assembly language. All versions of WordPerfect up to 5.0 were written in x86, and C was only adopted with WP 5.1, when it became necessary to convert it to non-IBM compatible computers. The use of straight assembly language and a high amount of direct screen access gave WordPerfect a significant performance advantage over WordStar, which used strictly DOS API functions for all screen and keyboard access, and was often very slow. In addition, WordStar, originally created for the CP/M operating system, in which subdirectories are not supported, was slow to support sub-directories in MS-DOS.

In 1983, WordPerfect 3.0 was released for DOS. This was updated to support DOS 2.x, sub-directories, and hard disks. It also expanded printer support, where WordPerfect 2.x only supports Epson and Diablo printers that were hard-coded into the main program. Adding support for additional printers this way was impractical, so the company introduced printer drivers, a file containing a list of control codes for each model of printer. Version 3.0 has support for 50 different printers, and this was expanded to 100 within a year. WordPerfect also supplied an editor utility that allows users to make their own printer drivers, or to modify the included ones. A version of WordPerfect 3.0 became the Editor program of WordPerfect Office.

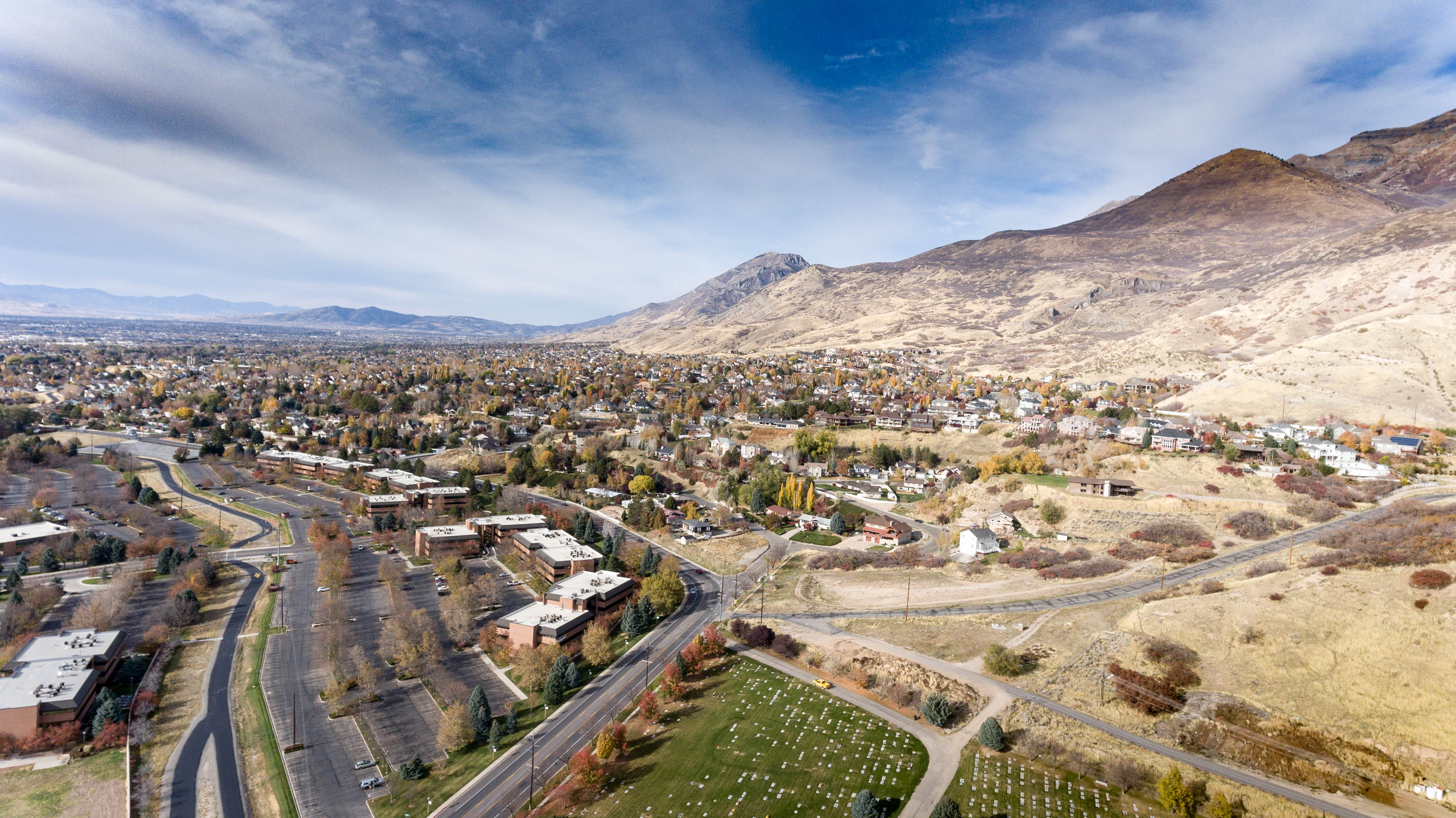
At its peak, WordPerfect Corporation occupied a 12-building campus in Orem, Utah, in the foothills of the Wasatch Range.

WordPerfect 4.0 was released in 1984; by then WordPerfect was the third most-popular word processor, behind WordStar and MultiMate. WordPerfect 4.1 appeared in 1985, with versions for various non-PC compatibles such as Tandy 2000 and DEC Rainbow. WordPerfect 4.2, released in 1986, introduced automatic paragraph numbering, important to law offices, and automatic numbering and placement of footnotes and endnotes that were important both to law offices and academics. It became the first program to overtake the original market leader WordStar in a major application category on the DOS platform.

By 1986 more than 300 large companies used what had become the best-selling word processor in the United States, with 60% of sales from word of mouth. SSI (renaming itself WordPerfect Corporation that year) was the fifth-largest independent software company, with $52 million in annual sales. Sales doubled to more than $100 million in 1987 for the 350 WordPerfect Corp. employees, including 100 in customer support. Ashton left BYU to serve as full-time president. That year Compute! magazine described WordPerfect as "a standard in the MS-DOS world" and "a powerhouse program that includes almost everything". Competitor WordMARC cited its rival by name, advertising that "WordPerfect Ain't". In a negative review of DisplayWrite, John V. Lombardi noted that the IBM product was the same price as WordPerfect but without the latter's "such superior support".

By this time the company occupied eight small locations around Orem; Peterson described WordPerfect's growth as a "crisis", forcing it to take any new available office space while planning for a new corporate headquarters by the end of the year. Rapid growth continued, with $196 million in sales in 1988 and 1100 employees increasing to more than $500 million in 1990 and 4000 employees. By then WordPerfect Corporation was the third-largest PC software vendor, ahead of Ashton-Tate; WordPerfect and Microsoft Word were the two leading word processors, each competing with the other in frequently adding features and lowering prices, and with significantly more market shares than DisplayWrite 4 and MultiMate.

In November 1989, WordPerfect Corporation released the program's most successful version, WordPerfect 5.1 for DOS, the first version to include pull-down menus to supplement the traditional function key combinations, support for tables, a spreadsheet-like feature, and full support for typesetting options, such as italic, redline, and strike-through. This version also included "print preview", a graphical representation of the final printed output that became the foundation for WordPerfect 6.0's graphic screen editing. WordPerfect 5.1+ for DOS was introduced to allow older DOS-based PCs to utilize the new WordPerfect 6 file format. This version can read and write WordPerfect 6 files, included several third-party screen and printing applications (previously sold separately), and has several minor improvements.

WordPerfect Corporation acquired Reference Software International, makers of Grammatik, a popular grammar checker for DOS, in January 1993 for $19 million. RSI's employees were absorbed into WordPerfect in Orem, and the functionality of Grammatik and Reference Set (a spell checker that RSI also sold) were eventually integrated into WordPerfect. WordPerfect continued selling Grammatik as a standalone product for several years.

WordPerfect 6.0 for DOS, released in 1993, can switch between its traditional text-based mode and a graphical mode that shows the document as it would print out, known as WYSIWYG (what you see is what you get). WordPerfect 5 had introduced a print preview mode that displays the layout of the document on a page using generic fonts, but the view mode is uneditable. The editing still needed to be done in text mode.

By WordPerfect 6.0 the company had grown "to command more than 60 percent of the word processing software market".

In November 1993, WordPerfect acquired another Orem, UT based software company, SoftSolutions, to bolster one of its two core competencies - "work-group computing". According to Ken Duncan, president of SoftSolutions, the strategy was to broadly distribute SoftSolutions' "technical capabilities" in document management via WordPerfect's large "installed base" of users.

=== Key characteristics ===
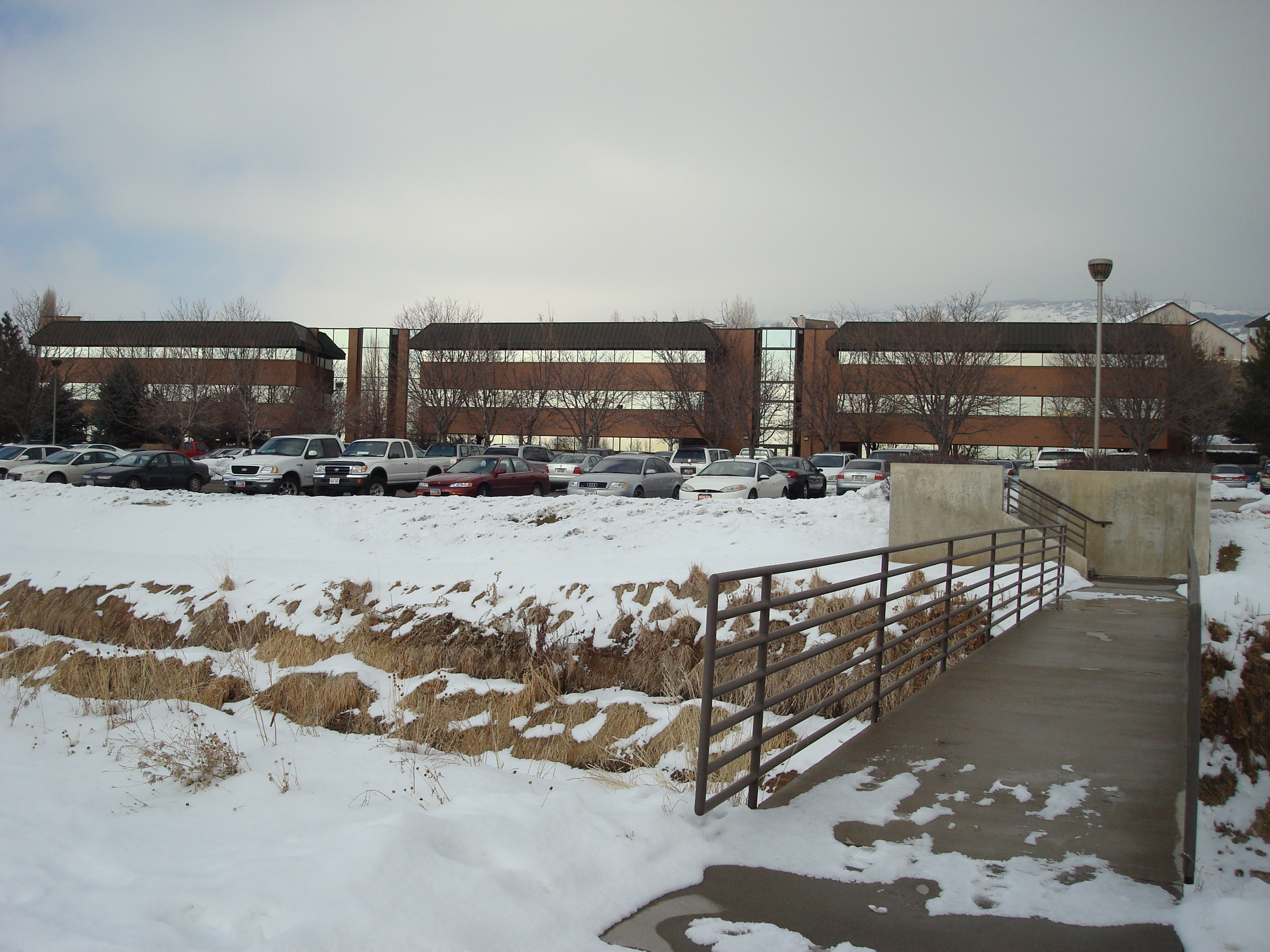
The WordPerfect headquarters building, seen years later

The distinguishing features of WordPerfect include:

- extensive use of function key combinations, especially on the MS-DOS platform, enabling quick access to features, once the meaning of the key combinations (like Ctrl–Shift–F6) had been memorized;
- its "streaming code" file format;
- its Reveal Codes feature; and
- its numbering of lines as the legal profession requires
- its macro/scripting capability, now provided through PerfectScript.

The ease of use of tools, like Mail Merge (combine form documents with data from any data source), "Print as booklet", and tables (with spreadsheet capabilities and the possibility to generate graphs) are also notable.

The WordPerfect document format allows continuous extending of functionality without jeopardizing backward and forward compatibility. Despite the fact that the newer version is extremely rich in functionality, WordPerfect X5 documents are fully compatible with WordPerfect 6.0a documents in both directions. The older program simply ignores the "unknown" codes, while rendering the known features of the document. WordPerfect users were never forced to upgrade for compatibility reasons for more than two decades.

==== Streaming code architecture ====
WordPerfect's streaming code architecture resembles the formatting features of HTML and Cascading Style Sheets. Documents are created much the same way that raw HTML pages are written, with text interspersed by tags (called "codes") that trigger treatment of data until a corresponding closing tag is encountered, at which point the settings active to the point of the opening tag resume control. As with HTML, tags can be nested. Some data structures are treated as objects within the stream as with HTML's treatment of graphic images, e.g., footnotes and styles, but the bulk of a WordPerfect document's data and formatting codes appear as a single continuous stream. A difference between HTML tags and WordPerfect codes is that HTML codes can all be expressed as a string of plain text characters delimited by greater-than and less-than characters, e.g. <strong>text</strong>, whereas WordPerfect formatting codes consist of hexadecimal values.

==== Styles and style libraries ====
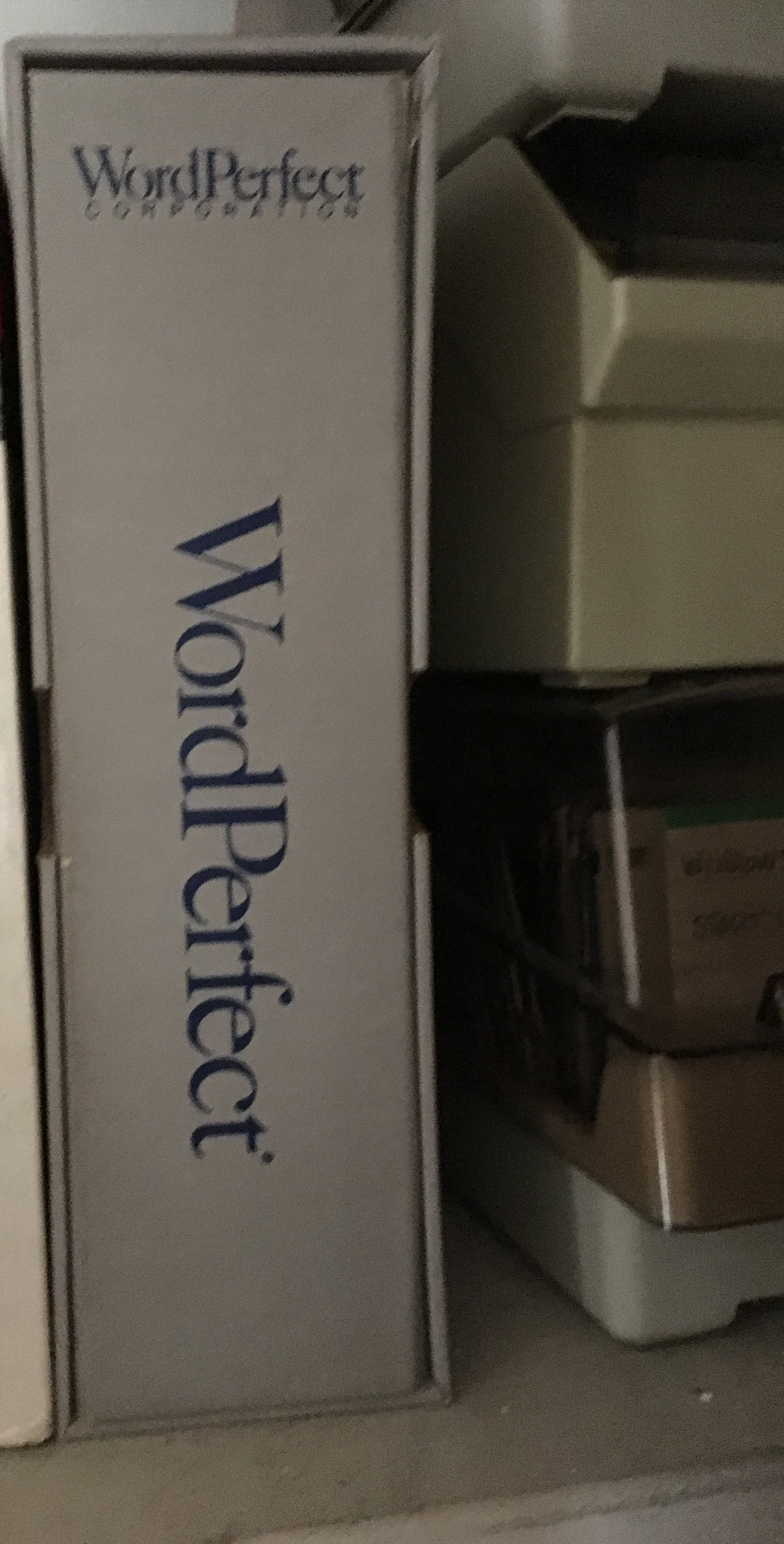
WordPerfect for DOS box, next to storage boxes for 3½-inch diskettes

The addition of styles and style libraries in WP 5.0 provided greatly increased power and flexibility in formatting documents, while maintaining the streaming-code architecture of earlier versions. Styles are a preset arrangement of settings having to do with things like fonts, spacings, tab stops, margins and other items having to do with text layout. Styles can be created by the user to shortcut the setup time when starting a new document, and they can be saved in the program's style library. Prior to that, its only use of styles was the Opening Style, which contained the default settings for a document.

After the purchase of the desktop publishing program Ventura, Corel enhanced the WordPerfect styles editor and styles behavior with the majority of Ventura's capabilities. This improved the usability and performance of graphic elements like text boxes, document styles, footer and header styles.

Since WordPerfect has been enriched with properties from the CorelDraw Graphics suite, graphic styles are editable. The Graphics Styles editor enables customizing the appearance of boxes, borders, lines and fills and store the customized design for reuse. The possibilities include patterns and color gradients for fills; corner, endpoint, pen-type and thickness for lines. Box styles can be used as container style, including a border, lines, fill, text and caption; each with its separate style. A text box style shows that WordPerfect cascades its styles.

Around the same time, Corel included WordPerfect, with its full functionality, in CorelDraw Graphics Suite as the text editor.

==== Reveal codes ====
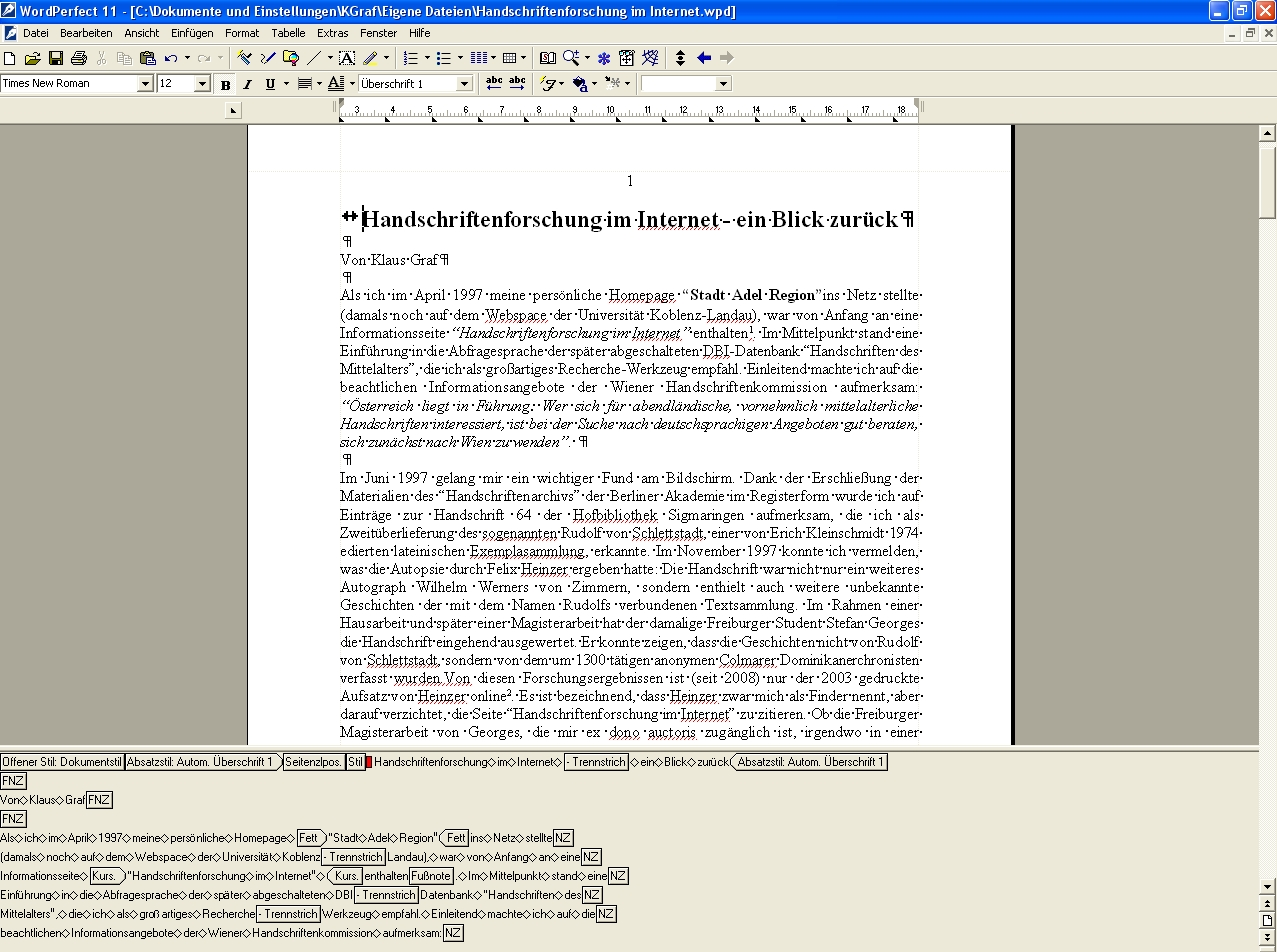
The Reveal Codes feature in WordPerfect

Present since the earliest versions of WordPerfect, the Reveal Codes feature distinguishes it from other word processors; Microsoft Word's equivalent is much less powerful. This feature in WordPerfect displays and allows editing the codes, reduces retyping, and enables easy formatting changes. It is a second editing screen that can be toggled open and closed, and sized as desired.

The codes for formatting and locating text are displayed, interspersed with tags and the occasional objects, with the tags and objects represented by named tokens. This provides a more detailed view to troubleshoot problems than with styles-based word processors, and object tokens can be clicked with a pointing device to directly open the configuration editor for the particular object type, e.g. clicking on a style token brings up the style editor with the particular style type displayed. WordPerfect had this feature already in its DOS incarnations.

==== Macro languages ====
WordPerfect for DOS has macros, in which sequences of keystrokes, including function codes, are recorded as the user typed them. These macros can be assigned to any key desired. This enables any sequence of keystrokes to be recorded, saved, and recalled. Macros can examine system data, make decisions, be chained together, and operate recursively until a defined "stop" condition occurs. This capability provides a powerful way to rearrange data and formatting codes within a document where the same sequence of actions needs to be performed repetitively, e.g., for tabular data. Since keystrokes are recorded, changes in the function of certain keys as the program evolved mean that macros from one DOS version of WordPerfect do not necessarily run correctly on another version. Editing of macros was difficult until the introduction of a macro editor in Shell, in which a separate file for each WordPerfect product with macros enables the screen display of the function codes used in the macros for that product.

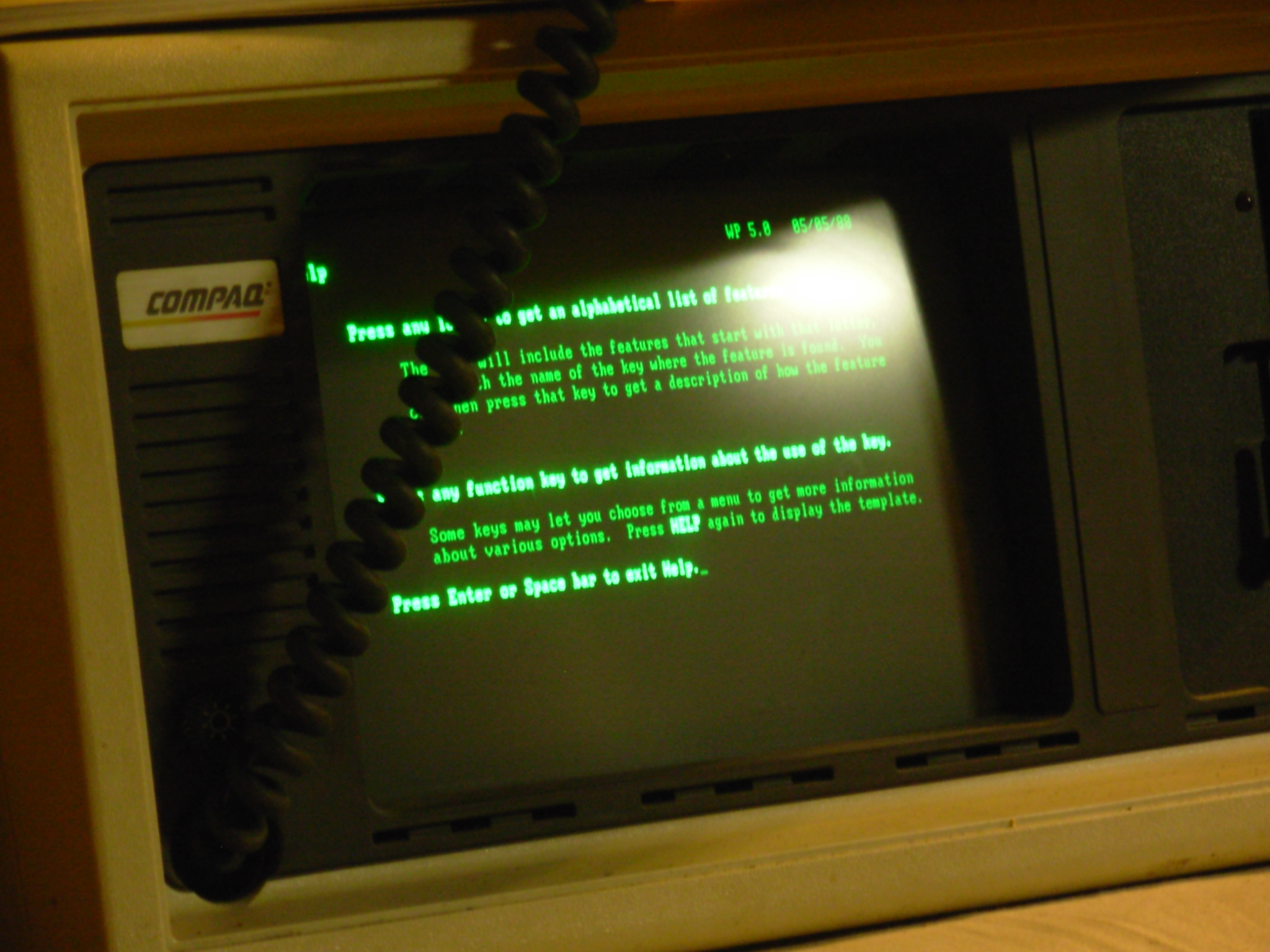
WordPerfect 5.0 for DOS running on a Compaq Portable home computer, 1988

WordPerfect DOS macros, which assume a text-based screen, with fixed locations on the screen, can not easily be implemented with the Windows WYSIWYG screen and mouse. For example, "go down four lines" has a clear meaning on a DOS screen, but no definite meaning with a Windows screen. WordPerfect lacks a way to meaningfully record mouse movements.

A new and even more powerful interpreted token-based macro recording and scripting language came with both DOS and Windows 6.0 versions, and that became the basis of the language named PerfectScript in later versions. It deals with functions rather than with keystrokes. There is no way to import DOS macros, and users who had created extensive macro libraries must continue using WordPerfect 5.1, or rewrite all the macros from scratch using the new programming language.

An important property of WordPerfect macros is that they are not embedded in a document. As a result, WordPerfect is not prone to macro viruses or malware, unlike MS Word. Despite the term "macro", the language has hundreds of commands and functions and creates full-fledged programs resident on and executed on the user's computer. In WPDOS 6 the source code is generated using the same interface used to edit documents. A WordPerfect macro can create or modify a document or perform tasks like displaying results of a calculation such as taking a date input, adding a specific number of days and displaying the new date in a dialog box. Documents created or edited by a WordPerfect macro are no different from those produced by manual input; the macros simply improve efficiency or automate repetitive tasks and also enabled creating content-rich document types, which would hardly be feasible manually.

Beginning with WordPerfect Office 10, the suite also included the Microsoft Office Visual Basic macro language as an alternative, meant to improve compatibility of the suite with Microsoft Office documents.

Macros may be used to create data-entry programs which enter information directly into WordPerfect documents, saving the time and effort required to retype it.

=== Support for European languages ===
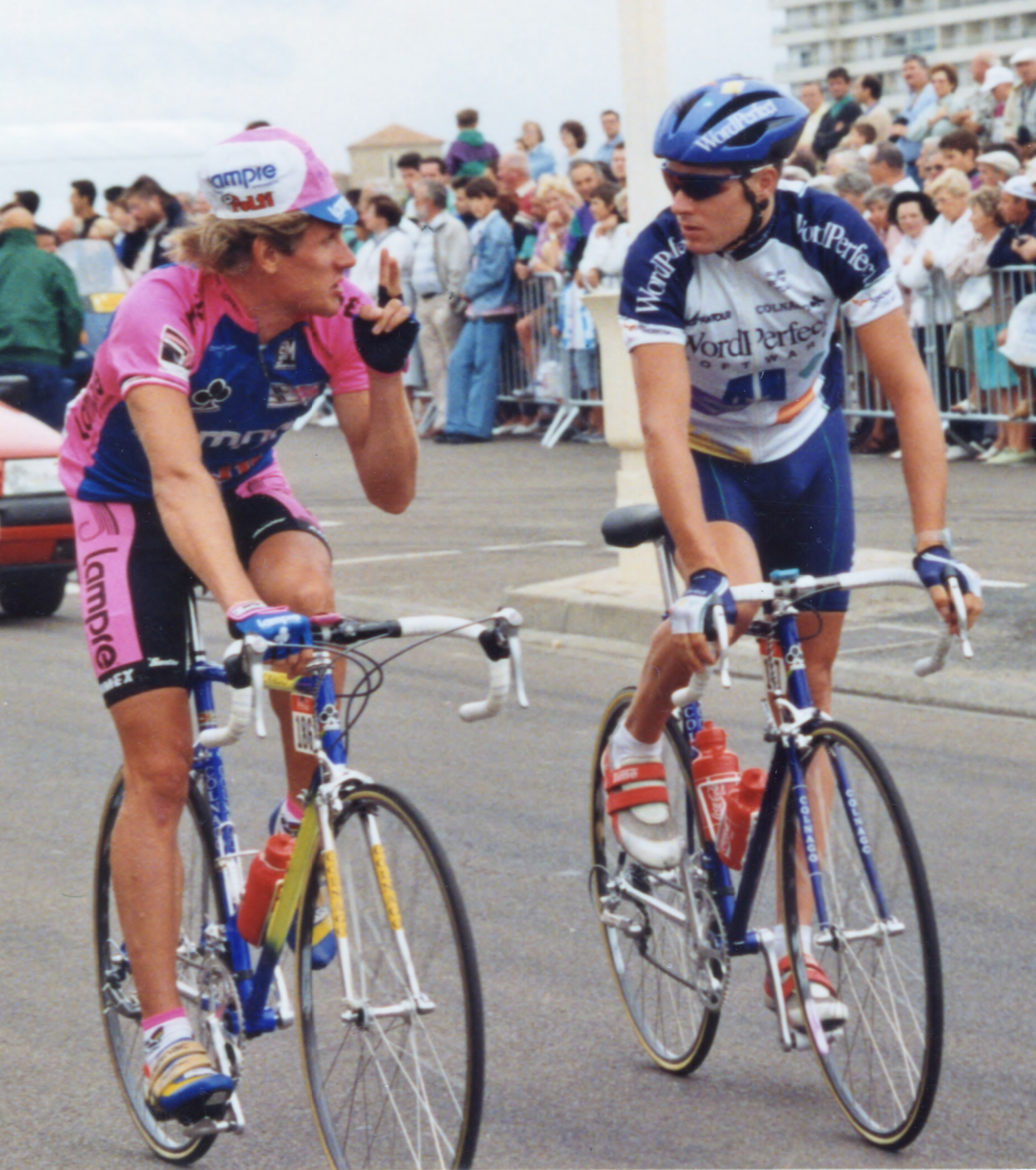
Member of the WordPerfect cycling team (right) at the Tour de France, 1993

WordPerfect's international division localized software and documentation into 12 languages. WordPerfect has support for European languages other than English. The Language Resource File (WP.LRS) specifies language formatting conventions.

In addition, WordPerfect Corporation did some aggressive marketing in Europe. In January 1993 it signed a three-year, $16 million deal to sponsor the WordPerfect cycling team in international competitions. The team was directed by the Dutchman Jan Raas. The move was intended to raise WordPerfect's profile throughout Europe and especially in the Alpine countries of France, Switzerland, and Italy, and it was also thought that young bicycling enthusiasts fit the WordPerfect user profile in the United States. In the third year of the deal (1995), Novell took over the sponsorship, due to having acquired WordPerfect.

=== Function keys ===
Like its 1970s predecessor Emacs and mid-1980s competitor MultiMate, WordPerfect uses almost every possible combination of function keys with Ctrl, Alt, and Shift modifiers, and the Ctrl-Alt, Shift-Alt, and Shift-Ctrl double modifiers, unlike early versions of WordStar, which uses only Ctrl.

WordPerfect uses F3 instead of F1 for Help, F1 instead of Esc for Cancel, and Esc for Repeat (though a configuration option in later versions allowed these functions to be rotated to locations that later became more standard).

The extensive number of key combinations are one of WP's most popular features among its regular "power users" such as legal secretaries, paralegals and attorneys.

=== Printer drivers ===
WordPerfect for DOS initially only supported a few printers. With the 2.2X versions, only two printers were fully supported: Diablo and Epson. However, with version 3.0, drivers were developed to support over fifty printers. A year after release, about two hundred printers were supported. WordPerfect version 3.0 also shipped with a printer driver editor called PTR, which features a flexible macro language, and allows technically inclined users to customize and create printer drivers.

Version 4.2 for DOS has a Type-Through feature that allows a user with certain compatible printers to use WordPerfect as a conventional typewriter. The functionality was removed in version 5.1 for DOS.

=== WordPerfect Library/Office utilities ===
WordPerfect Corporation produced a variety of ancillary and spin-off products. WordPerfect Library, introduced in 1986 and later renamed WordPerfect Office (not to be confused with Corel's Windows office suite of the same name), is a package of DOS network and stand-alone utility software for use with WordPerfect. The package includes a DOS menu shell and file manager which can edit binary files as well as WordPerfect or Shell macros, calendar, and a general-purpose flat file database program that can be used as the data file for a merge in WordPerfect and as a contact manager. WordPerfect Office was also one of the first commercially available email software packages.

After Novell acquired WordPerfect Corporation, it incorporated a number of these utilities into Novell GroupWise.

==== LetterPerfect ====
In 1990, the company offered LetterPerfect, which was a reduced-functionality version of WP-DOS 5.1 intended for use on less-capable hardware such as laptops, and as an entry-level product for students and home users; the name (but not the code) was purchased from a small Missouri company that produced one of the first word processors for the Atari 8-bit computers. LP does not support tables, labels, sorting, equation editing, or styles. It sold for about US$100 but did not catch on and was discontinued.

==== DataPerfect ====
Another program distributed through WordPerfect Corporation (and later through Novell) was DataPerfect for DOS, a fast and capable hierarchical database management system (DBMS) requiring as little as 300 KB of free DOS memory to run. It was written by Lew Bastian. In December 1995, Novell released DataPerfect as copyrighted freeware and allowed the original author to continue to update the program. Updates were developed until at least 2008.

DataPerfect supports up to 99 data files ("panels") with each holding up to 16 million records of up to 125 fields and an unlimited number of variable-length memo fields which can store up to 64,000 characters each. Networked, DataPerfect supports up to 10,000 simultaneous users.

==== PlanPerfect ====
Another program distributed through WordPerfect Corporation was PlanPerfect, a spreadsheet application. The first version with that name was reviewed in InfoWorld magazine in September 1987.

== WordPerfect for Windows ==
=== History ===
By the early 1990s, the growing popularity of Microsoft Windows narrowed the word processor market to a few supporting the operating system, including Word, WordPerfect, and Ami Pro. WordPerfect was late in coming to market with a Windows version. WordPerfect 5.1 for Windows, introduced in 1991, had to be installed from DOS and was largely unpopular due to serious stability issues. The first mature version, WordPerfect 5.2 for Windows, was released in November 1992 and WordPerfect 6.0 for Windows was released in 1993. By the time WordPerfect 5.2 for Windows was introduced, Microsoft Word for Windows version 2 had been on the market for over a year and had received its third interim release, v2.0c. However, WordPerfect for Windows still maintained the majority market share at that point.

WordPerfect's function-key-centered user interface did not adapt well to the new paradigm of a mouse and pull-down menus, especially with many of WordPerfect's standard key combinations overridden by incompatible keyboard shortcuts that Windows itself used; for example, Alt-F4 became Exit Program, as opposed to WordPerfect's Block Text. The DOS version's impressive arsenal of finely tuned printer drivers was also rendered obsolete by Windows' use of its own printer device drivers.

=== WordPerfect Bundles and Suite ===
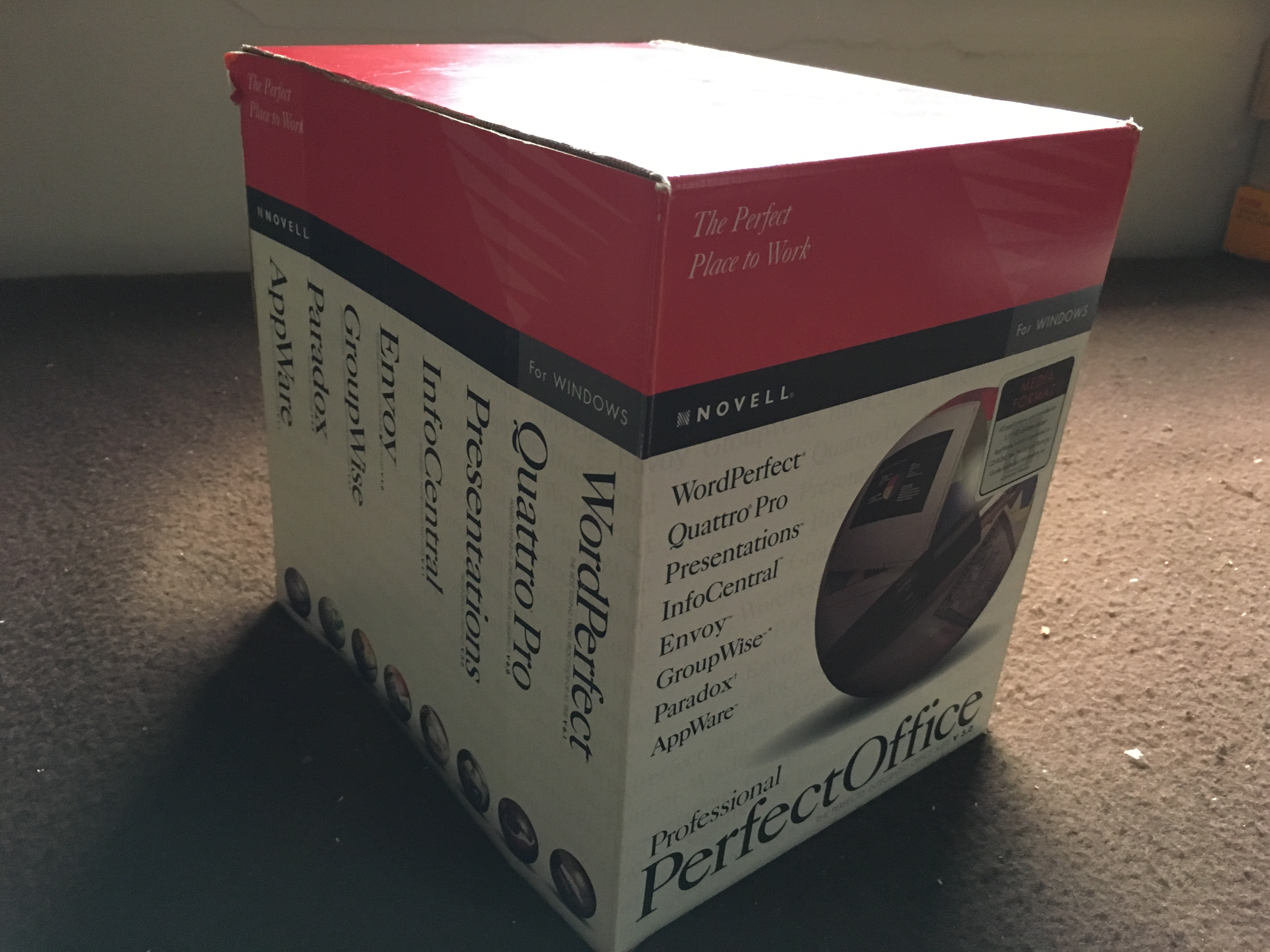
The PerfectOffice 3.0 suite, Professional edition, as released by Novell in 1995

In order to compete with Microsoft's Office Suite, WordPerfect and Borland created a bundled offering. The original bundled package included the WordPerfect word processor and Borland's Quattro Pro. WordPerfect became part of a full office suite when the company entered into a co-licensing agreement with Borland Software Corporation in 1993. The offerings were marketed by both companies: one as WordPerfect Office Suite, and the other as Borland Office, containing Windows versions of WordPerfect, Quattro Pro, Borland Paradox, and LAN-based groupware called WordPerfect Office. Originally based on the WordPerfect Library for DOS, the Novell / WordPerfect Office suite was integrated by "middleware". The most important middleware suite, still active in current versions of WordPerfect Office, is called PerfectFit (developed by WordPerfect). The other "middleware" (developed by Novell) was called AppWare.

=== Novell buys WordPerfect Company ===
Logo of WordPerfect, Novell Applications Group

Peterson said in 1987 "We don't want to acquire other companies, we don't want to merge with other companies, and we don't want to go public". Pressure grew on WordPerfect to either go public or merge with a publicly traded company so shareholders' families could gain market liquidity. Peterson left the company in March 1992, selling his ownership portion to Ashton and Bastian. A seven-person committee including Ashton and Bastian replaced Peterson. Revenue declined that year to $579 million from $622 million. The WordPerfect product line was sold twice, first to Novell in June 1994, for $1.4 billion, giving Ashton and Bastian almost $700 million in Novell stock each. Novell sold it (at a big loss) to Corel in January 1996. However, Novell kept the WordPerfect Office technology, incorporating it into its GroupWise messaging and collaboration product.

=== Microsoft vs Novell ===
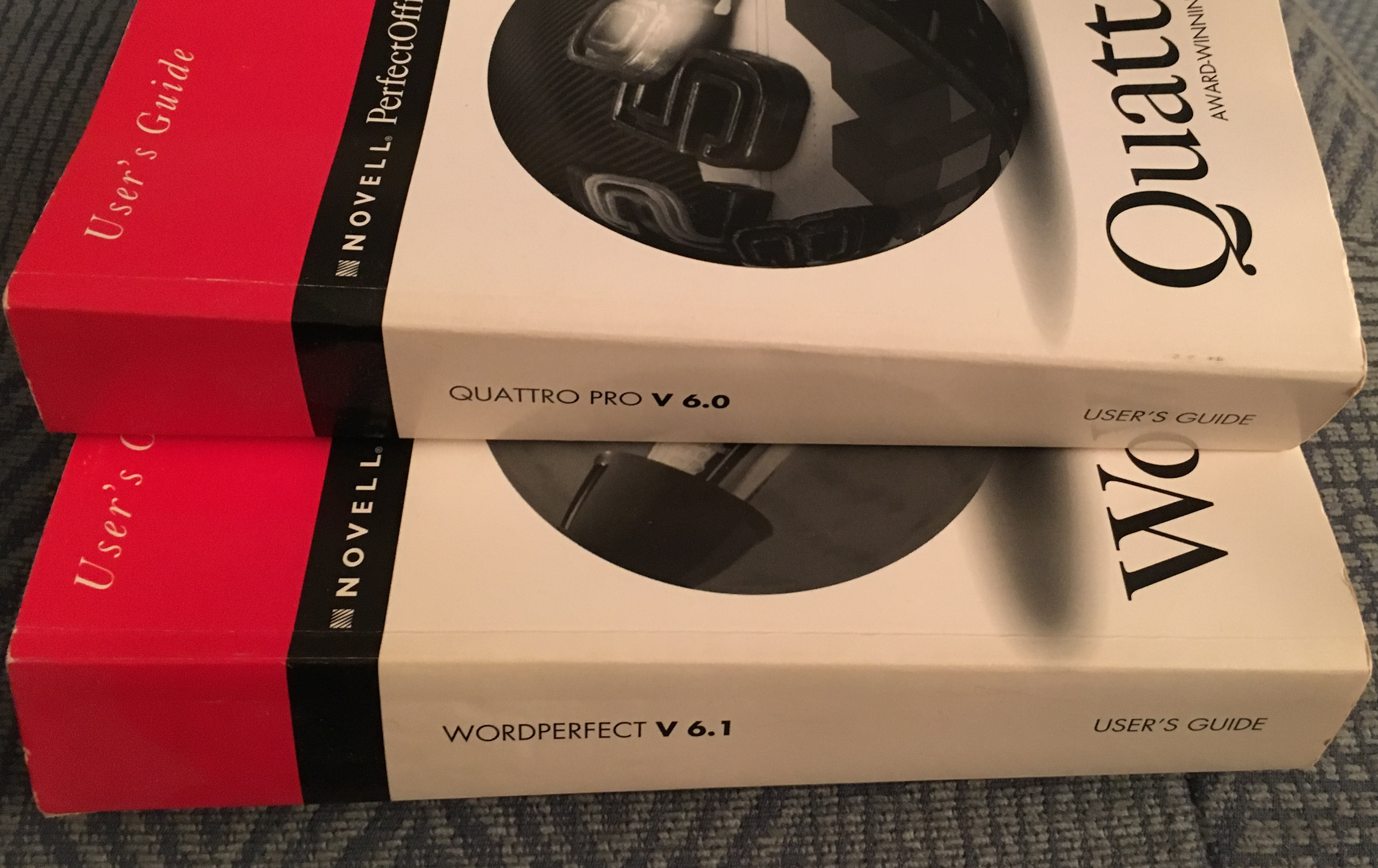
Novell-era user guides for WordPerfect and Quattro Pro

Compounding WordPerfect's troubles were issues associated with the release of the first 32-bit version, WordPerfect 7, intended for use on Windows 95. In the lawsuit 'Novell v. Microsoft', Novell argued that these problems were due to anti-competitive acts by Microsoft.

While WordPerfect 7 contained notable improvements over the 16-bit WordPerfect for Windows 3.1, it was released in May 1996, nine months after the introduction of Windows 95 and Microsoft Office 95 (including Word 95). The initial release suffered from notable stability problems. WordPerfect 7 also did not have a Microsoft "Designed for Windows 95" logo. This was important to some Windows 95 software purchasers as Microsoft set standards for application design, behavior, and interaction with the operating system. To make matters worse, the original release of WordPerfect 7 was incompatible with Windows NT, hindering its adoption in multiple professional environments. The "NT Enabled" version of WordPerfect 7, which Corel considered to be Service Pack 2, was not available until Q1-1997, over six months after the introduction of Windows NT 4.0, a year and a half after the introduction of Office 95 (which supported Windows NT out of the box), and shortly after the introduction of Office 97.

=== Market share ===
According to Ronni Marshak, editor of the The Office Computing Report, by 1993 WordPerfect Corporation had a reputation for arrogance, being a one-product DOS software company, and shipping late. While WordPerfect had 85% of the DOS word processor market in 1992, it had only one third of the Windows market compared to Microsoft's more than half. Word was reportedly the top-selling word processor that year. After Windows 3.0 was introduced, Word's market share began to grow at an extraordinary rate. A Windows version of WordPerfect was not introduced until nearly two years after Windows 3.0, and was met with poor reviews. Word also benefited from being included in an integrated office suite package much sooner than WordPerfect. The rivalry extended to advertising. In October 1993 WordPerfect Corporation sued Microsoft in the United States District Court for the Southern District of New York over advertisements calling Word "the most popular word processor in the world", arguing that by installed base and total units sold WordPerfect remained the leader, while Microsoft cited sales data for 1992 and the first half of 1993 in which Word outsold WordPerfect. The two companies settled within days and withdrew the suit, announcing only that the matter had been resolved to their mutual satisfaction.

Computer Intelligence estimated in 1987 that WordPerfect had 11% of the Fortune 1000 PC word processor market, third behind Ashton-Tate's 18% and IBM and MicroPro's 25% each. By then, according to Computerworld, the company was the leader in word processor sales, ahead of Microsoft, Lotus Development, and Ashton-Tate. A 1988 PC reader survey found that 27% used WordPerfect. While WordPerfect grew to as much as 60% of the market by the early 1990s, one consultant for the legal profession in 1990 estimated that 70% of law firms used it, 46% of respondents in a 1990 American Institute of Certified Public Accountants survey used WordPerfect, Dataquest estimated that WordPerfect had 23% of the Windows word processor market in 1991, and the application had more than 50% of the worldwide word-processing market in 1995, by 2000 Word had up to 95%; it was so dominant that WordPerfect executives admitted that their software needed to be compatible with Word documents to survive.

=== Application integration and middleware ===
While Microsoft offered something that looked like a fully integrated office suite in Microsoft Office, a common complaint about early Windows versions of WordPerfect Office was that it looked like a collection of separate applications from different vendors cobbled together, with inconsistent user interfaces from one application to another.

Enabling applications from various software developers to work together on every platform was part of the Novell strategy. Novell had acquired WordPerfect for Windows from WordPerfect Corporation, Paradox from Borland, and various peripheral utilities from other companies and had started to evangelize the Novell "middleware" – Appware – as a means for others to run their programs on every operating system. This "middleware" strategy would make software vendors and customers independent from operating system vendors, like Microsoft, thus posing a real threat.

Unlike Novell, however, Corel integrated the components of WordPerfect Office 9 and later almost seamlessly. PerfectScript and the middleware PerfectFit played the major role here. Elements of applications like CorelDraw and Ventura desktop publishing were also integrated and enriched the document format.

=== Faithful customers ===
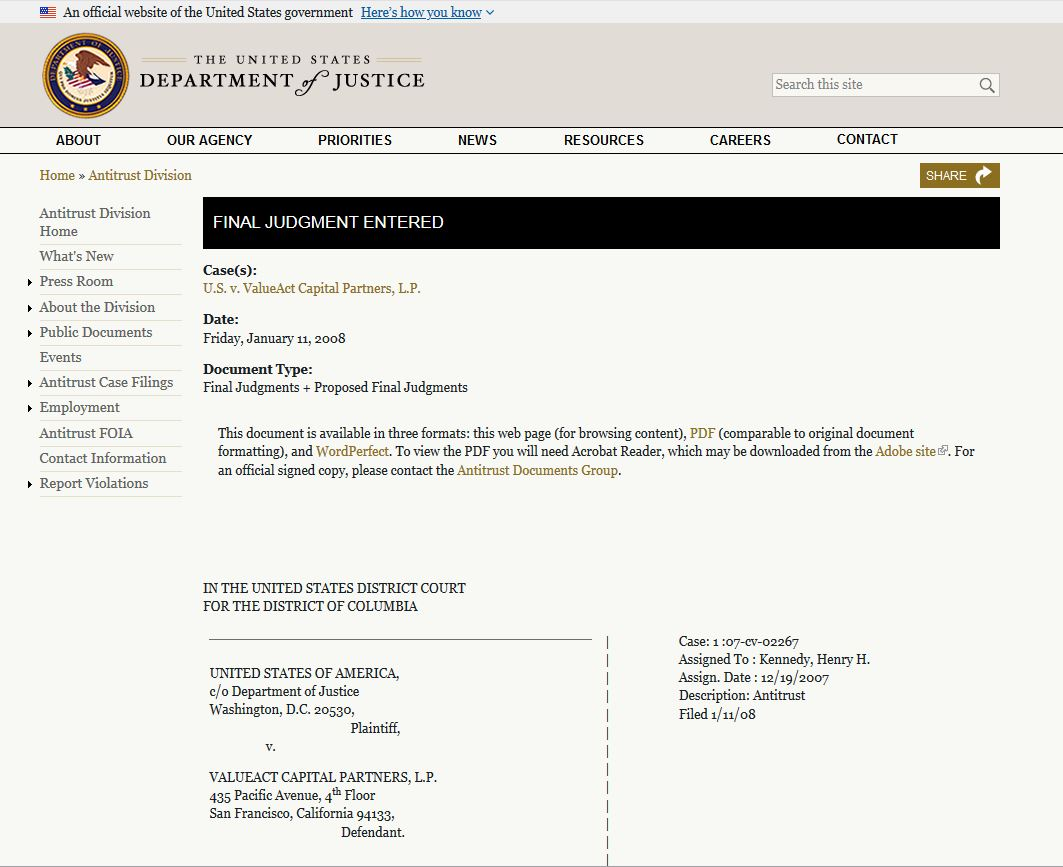
An example from 2008 of a U.S. Department of Justice court ruling that can be downloaded in WordPerfect format – but not in Word format

Among the remaining avid users of WordPerfect were a number of law firms and government offices, which favored WordPerfect features such as macros, reveal codes, and the ability to access a large range of formatting options such as left-right block indent directly with key combinations rather than having to click through several layers of submenus as Microsoft Word often requires. Fast typists appreciated the ability to keep their hands on the keyboard, rather than reaching for the mouse as often as would be required if they were using Microsoft Word. WordPerfect users may also define any key or key combination to do what they want, such as typing phrases they often use or executing macros. The user interface stayed almost identical from WPWin 6 through at least WP X5 (2010) and file formats did not change, as incompatible new formats would require keeping both obsolete software versions and obsolete hardware around just to access old documents.

Corel catered to these markets, with, for example, a major sale to the United States Department of Justice in 2005. A related factor is that WordPerfect Corporation was particularly responsive to feature requests from the legal profession, incorporating many features particularly useful to that niche market; those features have been continued in subsequent versions, usually directly accessible with key combinations. WordPerfect still had a level of presence among such users into the 2020s. Similarly, as of 2024, the French judiciary continues to use WordPerfect, and continues to offer training for its use.

=== Novell v. Microsoft antitrust lawsuit ===
In November 2004, Novell filed an antitrust lawsuit against Microsoft for alleged anti-competitive behavior (such as tying Word to sales of Windows and withdrawal of support for APIs) that Novell claims led to loss of WordPerfect market share. That lawsuit, after several delays, was dismissed in July 2012. Novell filed an appeal from the judgment in November 2012, but the Court of Appeals for the Tenth Circuit affirmed. Novell sought review in the US Supreme Court, but in 2014 that court declined to hear the case, ending the legal action almost a decade after it had begun.

=== Corel buys WordPerfect from Novell ===
Novell stated in November 1995 that it was putting its personal productivity product line up for sale. In January 1996 it announced that the sale of these products, primarily WordPerfect and Quattro Pro, would be made to Corel for $186 million, a large loss from what it had originally paid to acquire WordPerfect. Novell did hold onto a few pieces that it had acquired from WordPerfect, most importantly the GroupWise collaboration product.

The sale to Corel, which was headquartered in Ottawa, Ontario, was completed in March 1996. The head of Corel, Michael Cowpland, initially expressed optimism that Corel WordPerfect could compete effectively against Microsoft Word among business users, somewhat akin to a Coke versus Pepsi battle. The optimism was wrong; some new computers came loaded with Word along with Windows. Corel lost over $230 million for 1997.

In 1998, the WordPerfect development offices in Orem were closed, affecting over 500 employees. The software engineering for WordPerfect became centred in Corel's home city of Ottawa.

=== Corel WordPerfect ===
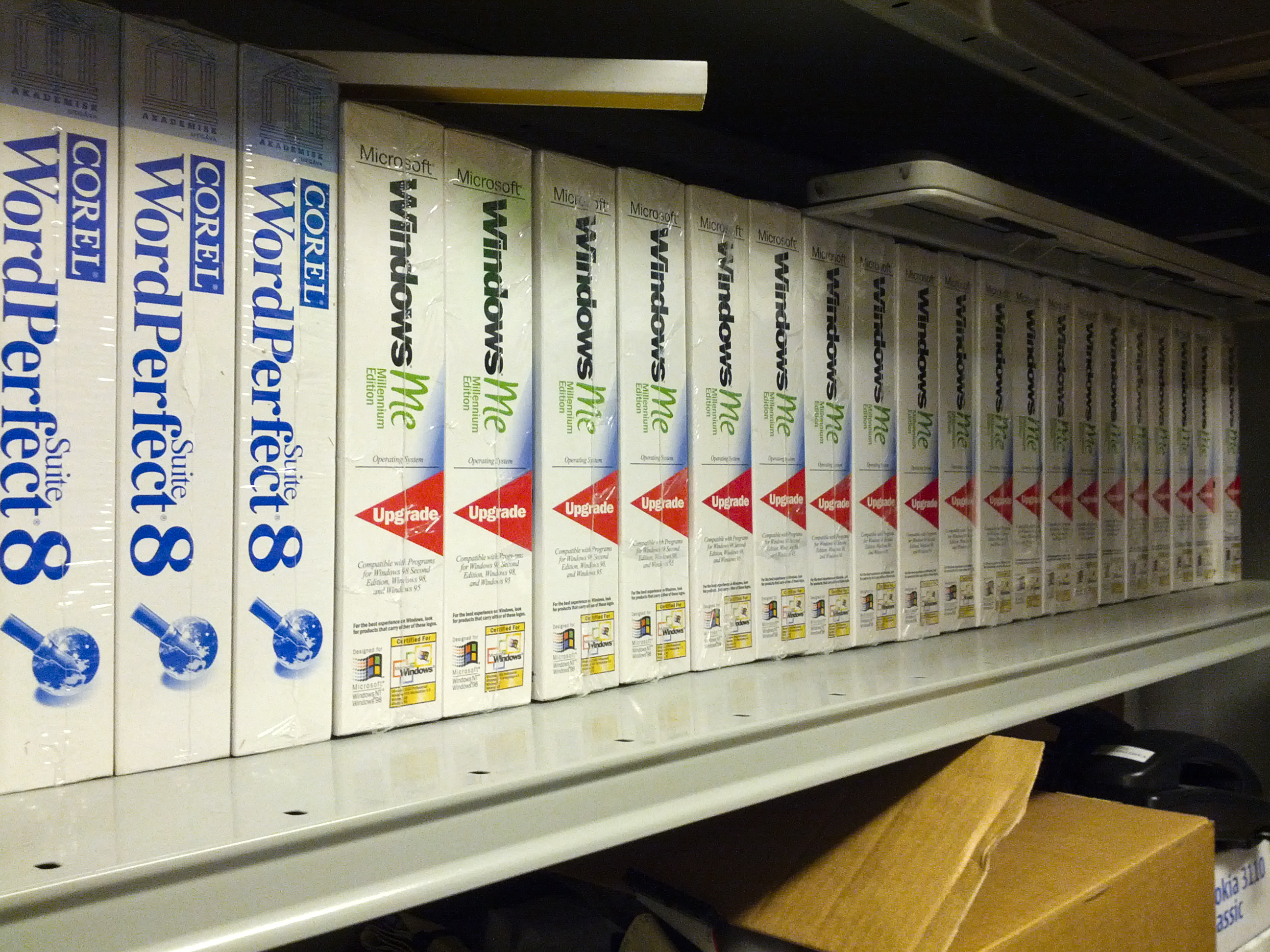
Boxes of Corel WordPerfect 8

Since its acquisition by Corel in 1996, WordPerfect for Windows was officially been known as Corel WordPerfect.

On January 17, 2006, Corel announced WordPerfect X3. Corel is an original member of the OASIS Technical Committee on the OpenDocument Format, and Paul Langille, a senior Corel developer, is one of the original four authors of the OpenDocument specification.

In January 2006, subscribers to Corel's electronic newsletter were informed that WordPerfect 13 was scheduled for release later in 2006. The subsequent release of X3 (identified as "13" internally and in registry entries) has been met with generally positive reviews, due to new features including a unique PDF import capability, metadata removal tools, integrated search and online resources and other features.

Version X3 was described by CNET in January 2006 as a "winner", "a feature-packed productivity suite that's just as easy to use — and in many ways more innovative than — industry-goliath Microsoft Office 2003." CNET went on to describe X3 as "a solid upgrade for long-time users", but that "Die-hard Microsoft fans may want to wait to see what Redmond has up its sleeve with the radical changes expected within the upcoming Microsoft Office 12."

Although the released version of X3 at the time did not support the OOXML or OpenDocument formats, a beta was released that supported both.

Reports surfaced late in January 2006 that Apple's iWork had leapfrogged WordPerfect Office as the leading alternative to Microsoft Office. This claim was soon debunked after industry analyst Joe Wilcox described JupiterResearch usage surveys that showed WordPerfect as the No. 2 office suite behind Microsoft Office in the consumer, small and medium businesses, and enterprise markets with a roughly 15 percent share in each market.

In April 2008, Corel released its WordPerfect Office X4 office suite containing the new X4 version of WordPerfect which includes support for PDF editing, OpenDocument and Office Open XML. However, X4 does not include support for editing PDFs containing images in JPEG2000 format, a format used by Adobe Acrobat 9.

In March 2010, Corel released its WordPerfect Office X5 office suite, which contains the new X5 version of WordPerfect. This version includes improved support for PDF, Microsoft Office 2007, OpenDocument, and Office Open XML. The new release includes integration with Microsoft SharePoint and other web services geared towards government and business users.

In April 2012, Corel released its WordPerfect Office X6 office suite, which contains the new X6 version of WordPerfect. The new release adds multi-document/monitor support, new macros, Windows 8 preview support, and an eBook publisher.

In May 2021, Corel released its WordPerfect Office 2021 office suite, which superseded versions x7 through x9 and version 2020. New features include creating fillable PDFs, built in Bates numbering (since X7), saving to opendocument and ePub formats (since v2020), and saving and opening Microsoft Office openXML formats (which did not work in x9). In a review, PC Magazine said that "WordPerfect Office is the one and only Windows office application suite that isn't a workalike for Microsoft Office. ... WordPerfect [is] the only office app that gives you total control over every detail of the documents you produce." The review noted that WordPerfect still had a significant presence in the legal domain, "where it's the only app that offers both advanced legal-formatting features and a document management system that doesn't rely on Microsoft's networking software." However, the magazine noted that the WordPerfect Office 2021 user interface "has an old-school look and feel that won't attract many new users", that it does not support real-time collaboration workflows, and that the product only runs on Windows and not Macintosh or mobile platforms.

== WordPerfect Suite and WordPerfect Office ==
Corel WordPerfect Office
- Developer: Corel Corporation
- Release: 1994
- Stable release: 2020 (20) / May 5, 2020
- Written in: C++
- Operating system: Windows 7 and later
- Type: Office suite
- License: Proprietary
- Website: www.wordperfect.com

WordPerfect Suite and WordPerfect Office is an office suite developed by Corel Corporation. It originates from Borland Software Corporation's Borland Office, released in 1993 to compete against Microsoft Office and AppleWorks. Borland's suite bundled three key applications: WordPerfect, Quattro Pro and Paradox. Borland then sold the suite to Novell in 1994, which led to the addition of Novell Presentations and the now-defunct InfoCentral. It was then sold to Corel in 1996.

=== Corel WordPerfect Suite 7 and Office 7 Professional ===
Corel WordPerfect Suite 7 featured version 7 of its core applications: WordPerfect, Quattro Pro and Presentations while Office 7 Professional included Paradox as well. Both versions of the suite also bundled CorelFLOW 3, Sidekick, Dashboard and Envoy 7. The suite for Windows was released in 1996 to retail.

=== Corel WordPerfect Office 2000 ===
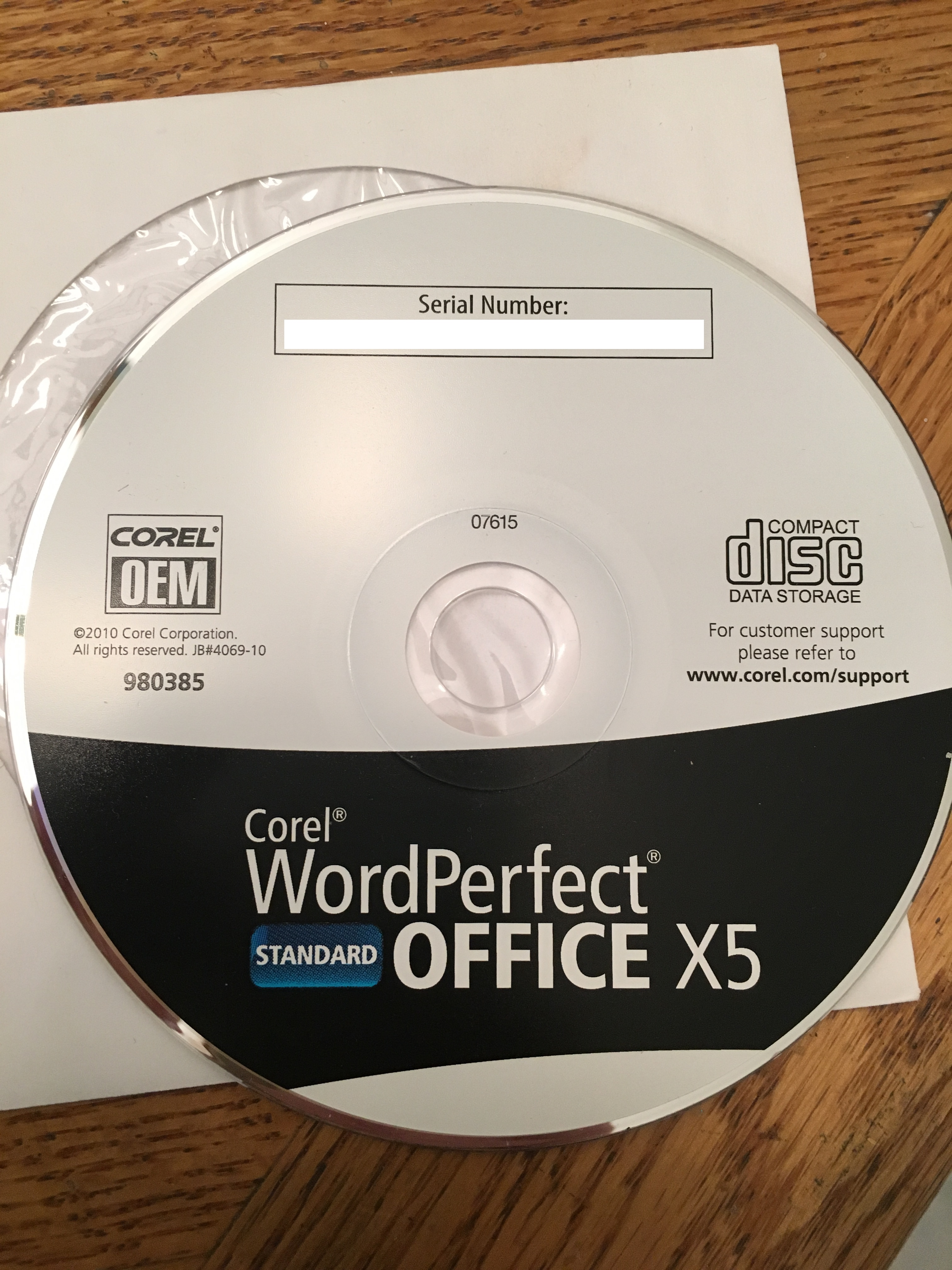
Corel WordPerfect Office X5 suite, available in 2010

Corel WordPerfect Office 2000 featured version 9 of its core applications: WordPerfect, Quattro Pro, Presentations, Paradox and CorelCentral. All versions of the suite also bundle Trellix 2 and Microsoft Visual Basic for Applications. The suite for Windows was released on November 16, 1998, as a preview and on May 25, 1999, to retail. The Home and Student edition, as well as the Family Pack, omit the Presentations and Paradox software. Small Business edition was released on January 31, 2000, and omits Paradox.

Several variants of this suite exist. One of these is the Family Pack, sold in versions 2 and 3 at a reduced price. This version cannot be used in a commercial setting. Three variants of the suite were created to integrate voice recognition. The first, the Voice Powered Edition, includes Dragon Naturally Speaking 3 and was released in North America. The second, available at some international locations, included Philips newest generation of FreeSpeech. The third is WordPerfect Law Office 2000, released on December 20, 1999. It features NaturallySpeaking Standard 4 and bundles several programs designed for lawyers. Another notable variant is WordPerfect Office 2000 for Linux, released on March 10, 2000. Although it supports various Linux distributions, it was designed with Corel Linux in mind as a way to upgrade such systems, which bundled a free version of the WordPerfect word processor.

=== Latest version ===
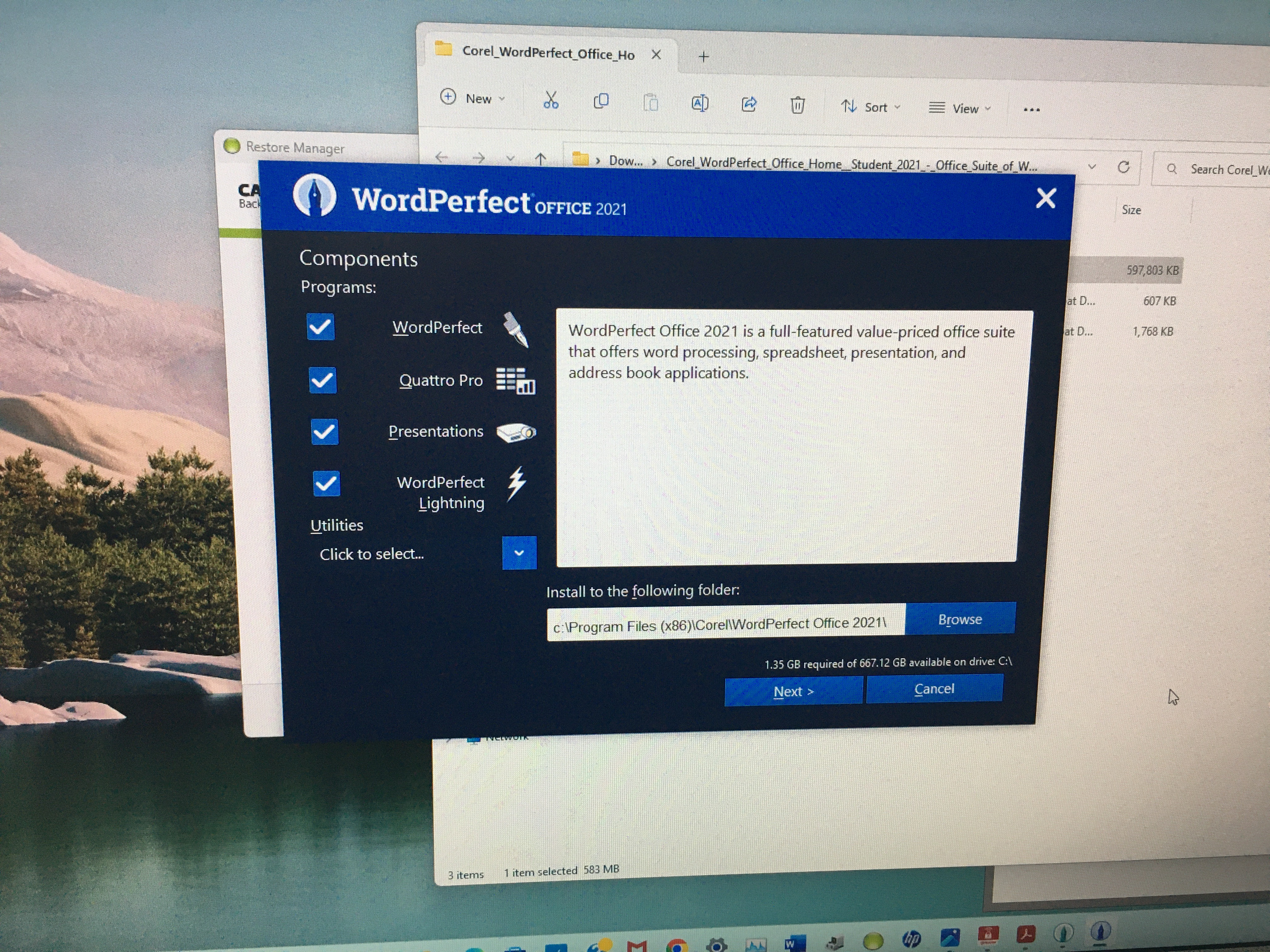
Corel WordPerfect Office 2021 being installed on a Windows 11 system, with Quattro Pro, Presentations, and WordPerfect Lightning all listed

The latest version is WordPerfect Office 2021, released May 2021. The suite is offered in three editions: Home and Student, Standard, and Professional, with only the last of these including Paradox.

=== Quattro Pro ===
Quattro Pro is a spreadsheet program that originally competed against the dominant Lotus 1-2-3 and now competes against LibreOffice Calc, Microsoft Excel, Google Sheets and Apple's Numbers. Corel's application is available only for the Windows platform.

=== Presentations ===
Presentations is a presentation program by Corel. Its main competitors include LibreOffice Impress, Microsoft PowerPoint, Google Slides, and Apple's Keynote.

=== WordPerfect Lightning ===
WordPerfect Lightning is a note-taking application. Its main competitors are Evernote, Microsoft OneNote, Google Keep and Apple's Notes.

=== Other desktop applications ===
Paradox is a relational database manager for Windows. Its main competitors are LibreOffice Base and Microsoft Access.

== "Classic Mode" ==
Corel added "Classic Mode" in WordPerfect 11. Although this displays the "classic" cyan Courier text on medium blue background, it is not a true emulation of the DOS version. It does select the WPDOS 5.1 Keyboard. (The 6.1 Keyboard is available too.) The WPWin macro system, which remains unchanged, is quite different from that of WPDOS, and conversion is not easy. The menu remains the WPWin menu, and the available Toolbars are WPWin toolbars.

== Version history ==
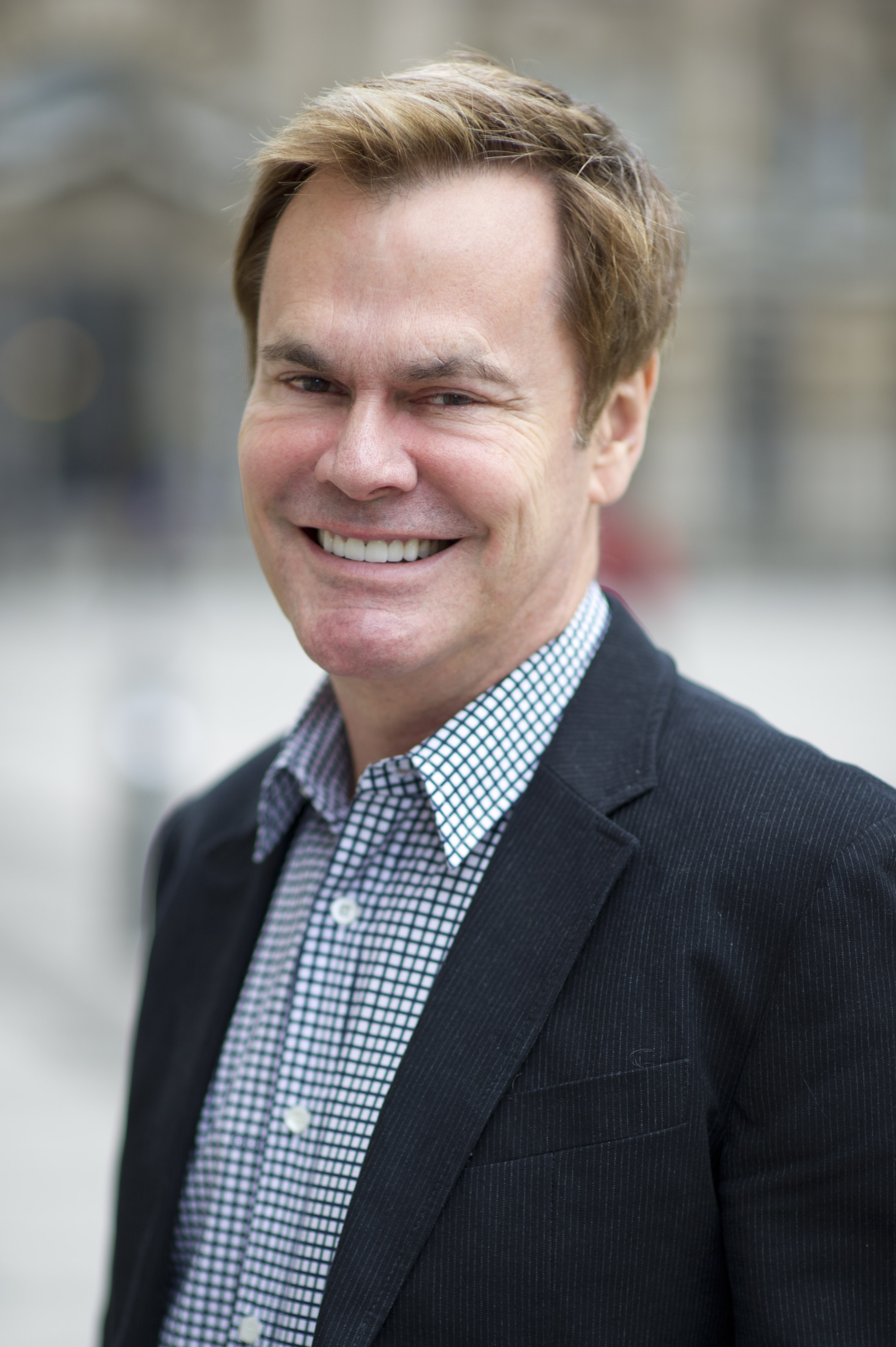
WordPerfect co-founder Bruce Bastian in 2011

=== Summary ===
WordPerfect 9 and newer are bundled with the WordPerfect Office Suite and cannot be purchased separately.

Operating system		Latest stable version	Support status
Microsoft Windows	7, 8, 10 (32-bit or 64-bit), 11	2021	2018–present
Microsoft Windows	XP SP3 / 2003 SP2, Vista	X7	2001–2015
Microsoft Windows	2000 / 98 SE / Me	X3	1998–2008
Microsoft Windows	NT 4	12	1996–2006
Microsoft Windows	95 OSR2	10	1995–2003
Microsoft Windows	3.1x	7	1991–1997
Linux	With CorelWine	9.0	2000
Linux	Desktop kernel 2.0 and newer	8.1	1996–1999
DOS	3.1 and higher	6.2	1982–1997
Classic Mac OS	7.0 – 9.2.2	3.5e (Note: Mac version numbers are much lower than their Windows counterpart for comparable functionality. For example, WordPerfect 3.5e was the final release for Mac OS, but despite its version number, it boasted compatibility with WordPerfect 7 for Windows 95 files)	1988–1997
Unix (Note: There were about thirty Unix ports of Wordperfect in total.)		8.0	1988–1998
Java		Beta	1997
OS/2		5.2	1989–1993
NeXTSTEP		1.0.1	1991
OpenVMS		7.1 (Note: Known versions for OpenVMS include 5.1, 5.3 and 7.1, year of release unknown.)	1987–?
Data General		4.2	1980–1989
Amiga		4.1	1987
Atari ST		4.1	1987-1991
Apple II		1.1	1985–1993
Apple IIGS		2.1e	1987–1993

In addition, versions of WordPerfect have also been available for Apricot, Tandy 2000, TI Professional, Victor 9000, and Zenith Z-100 systems.

Known versions for IBM System/370 include 4.2, released 1988.

Known versions for the DEC Rainbow 100 include version (?), released November 1983.

=== Unix ===
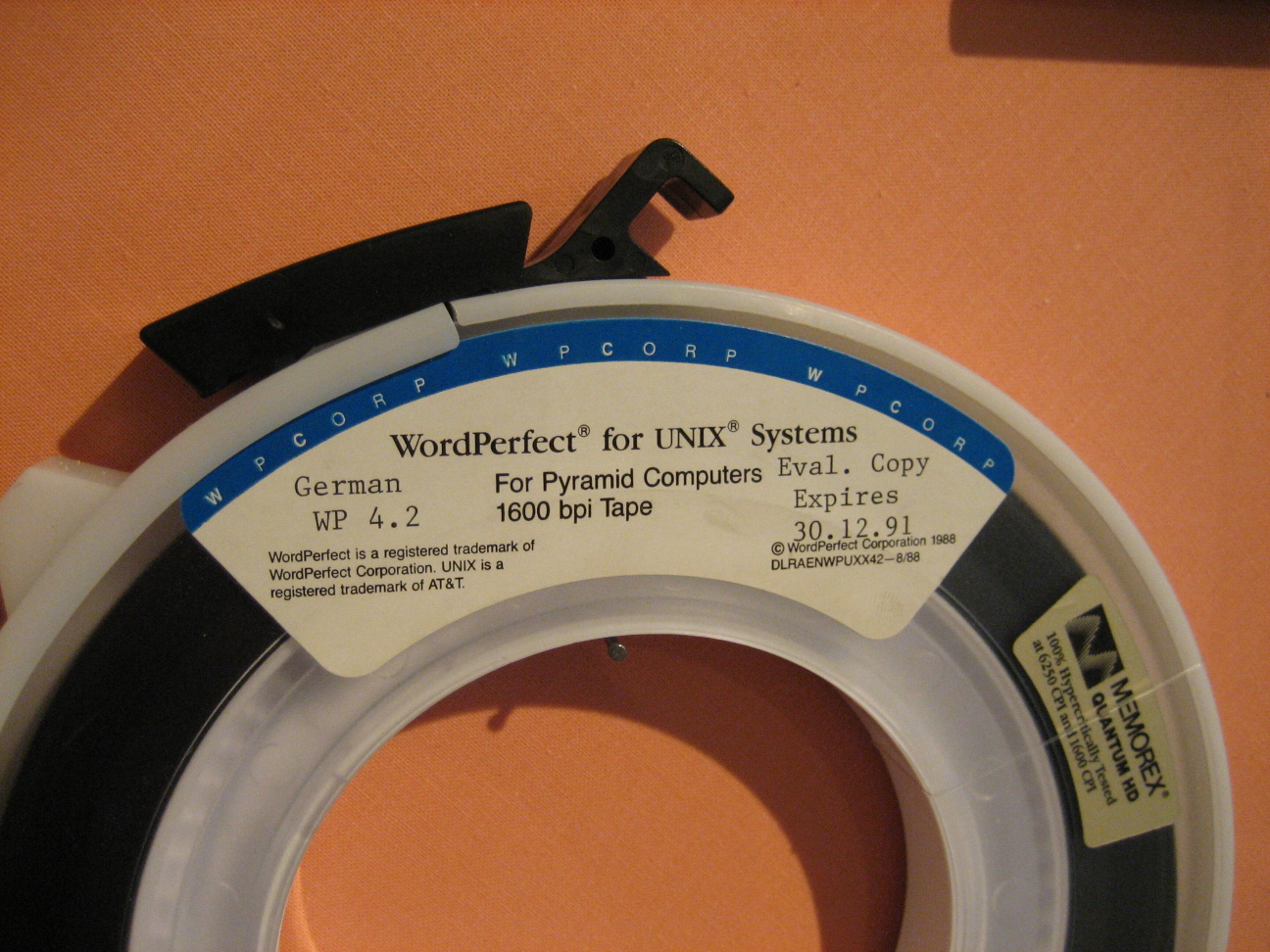
A magnetic tape distribution of WordPerfect 4.2 for Pyramid Unix, 1991

At one time or another, WordPerfect was available on around 30 flavors of Unix, including AT&T, NCR, SCO Xenix, SCO OpenServer, UnixWare, Microport Unix, DEC Ultrix, Pyramid Tech Unix, Tru64, IBM AIX, Motorola System V/88, and HP-UX, SGI IRIX and Solaris.

In July 2022, Tavis Ormandy ported "WordPerfect for Unix" 7, to modern Linux distributions, as a fully functional deb package. The program can print to CUPS printers through ghostscript.

=== Macintosh ===
Development of WordPerfect for Macintosh did not run parallel to versions for other operating systems, and used version numbers unconnected to contemporary releases for DOS and Windows.

Originally schedule for release in early 1987, version 1 was so late that it was described as vaporware. In early 1988 the company began selling a beta version for $99, with the promise that customers would receive the $395 final version—scheduled for spring 1988—for free. After releasing version 1.0 in April, the company released three more "version 1.0" with bug fixes within three weeks; nonetheless, by the end of the year WordPerfect for Macintosh became a best seller. Version 2 was a total rewrite, adhering more closely to Apple's UI guidelines. Version 3 took this further, making extensive use of the technologies Apple introduced in Systems 7.0–7.5, while remaining fast and capable of running well on older machines. Corel released version 3.5 in 1996, followed by the improved version 3.5e (for enhanced) in 1997. It was never updated beyond that, and the product was eventually discontinued. As of 2004, Corel has reiterated that the company has no plans to further develop WordPerfect for Macintosh (such as creating a native Mac OS X version).

For several years, Corel allowed Mac users to download version 3.5e from its website free of charge, and some Mac users still use this version. The download is still available at the Mac IO group (successor to the Yahoo group) along with the necessary OS 8/9/Classic Updater that slows scroll speed and restores functionality to the Style and Window menus. Like other Mac OS applications of its age, it requires the Classic environment on PowerPC Macs. While Intel Macs do not support Classic, emulators such as SheepShaver, Basilisk II and vMac allow users to run WordPerfect on any Macintosh computer (or indeed any Linux computer). Users wishing to use a current release of WordPerfect can run the Windows version through Boot Camp or virtualization software, and through Darwine or CrossOver Mac with mixed results.

=== Atari ST ===
Like the Macintosh version, development of WordPerfect for the Atari ST did not run parallel to the DOS versions. However the Atari ST version number aligned with contemporary DOS releases. In 1987, WordPerfect Corp. released version 4.1. This was the only Atari version ever released, but multiple patches and updates ensured that the Atari version of WordPerfect ran on all Atari ST, Atari STe, TT, and Falcon computers.

WordPerfect ST differs from the DOS version most notably in speed and number of windows a user can open. On the Atari ST version, a user can open up to four windows (compared to DOS' two) and the application runs three to five times faster than the DOS version (depending on which update or patch is installed). This was possible because WordPerfect for the Atari ST was designed from the ground up and was optimized for the Motorola 68000 processor as well as Atari's GEM (Graphics Environment Manager) operating system.

WordPerfect for the Atari ST retailed at US$395 with registered Atari user groups being offered the program at $155 along with a student version for US$99. The price of WordPerfect was significantly higher than most of the other Atari word processors available at the time. Atari Corporation published a version of Microsoft Write (the Atari version of Microsoft Word 1.05 for the Macintosh) for US$129.95 (almost 75% off the suggested retail price of WordPerfect), which did not help WordPerfect's campaign to establish itself as the standard word processor on the Atari platform.

Like other versions, WordPerfect for the ST was not copy-protected. Antic magazine wrote "WordPerfect Corp. doesn't need to worry too much about piracy: WordPerfect is almost unusable without its manual of over 600 pages!" The magazine was mistaken; in 1988 WordPerfect threatened to abandon the Atari market after copies of the word processor were found on several pirate bulletin board systems. However, support from the Atari community convinced WordPerfect to reconsider and support for the Atari ST continued, but only a single developer was assigned to the project to fix bugs.

Covering the subject of WordPerfect's commitment to the Atari ST market, ST-Log's Ian Chadwick writes, "WordPerfect Corp. squashed rumours that they would pull out of the Atari market, due to rampant piracy. WP was found on at least three pirate BBSs, but they are still making the effort to stay with us. That shows a serious commitment on their part. If you want them to remain part of this market, then show them the same amount of respect and don't make or accept any pirate copies of their product."

Worldwide sales numbers of WordPerfect for Atari ST would eventually help relieve the concerns of the piracy situation with Atari ST User reporting, "Talk here in the USA points to the fact that Word Perfect Corp. will continue to support the ST derivative of its WP package, currently at version 4.1 (functionally equivalent to MS-DOS version 4.2). There is even talk of further changes and an upgrade adding a few new features to the package. It seems that Word Perfect's ST sales have been good enough, particularly in Europe, to warrant a continued commitment to the product."

WordPerfect would go on to fully support version 4.1 for the Atari ST with a number of bug fixes, patches, system compatibility updates with all Atari ST, STe, TT, and Falcon computers, including their customer support from 1987 - 1991. A WordPerfect 5.1 version for the Atari ST was planned and in development but was later cancelled.

=== Amiga ===
In 1987, WordPerfect was ported to the Amiga 1000 and was upgraded through version 4.1 on the Amiga platform despite rumors of its discontinuation. The company's efforts were not well supported by Amiga users and it did not sell well. Though it could be started from the Workbench or CLI, WordPerfect remained a fundamentally text-oriented program and retained its DOS command structure. Satellite Software received criticism for releasing a non-graphical word processor on a graphically oriented system.

In 1989, WordPerfect Corporation stopped all Amiga development, including work on a version of PlanPerfect, stating that it had lost $800,000 on the computer and could not afford to add Amiga-specific features. After customers stated that they would be satisfied with a DOS-like word processor the company resumed development of only the Amiga version of WordPerfect, but discontinued it in 1992.

=== Linux ===
In 1995, WordPerfect 6.0 was made available for Linux as part of Caldera's Internet office package. In late 1997, a newer version was made available for download, but had to be purchased to be activated.

In 1998 Corel released WordPerfect 8.0 for Linux. The full version was sold as a package. A cut-down version was made available for downloading.

Hoping to establish themselves in the nascent commercial Linux market, Corel also developed its own distribution of Linux. This included WordPerfect 8.1 for Linux. Although the Linux distribution was fairly well-received, the response to WordPerfect for Linux varied. Some Linux promoters appreciated the availability of a well-known, mainstream application for the operating system.

Once OpenOffice.org appeared in 1999, there was little demand for a proprietary, closed-source project like WordPerfect. On top of this, WordPerfect 9.0, which was released as part of the WordPerfect Office 2000 for Linux package, was not a native Linux application like WP 6–8, but derived from the Windows version using Corel's own version of the Wine compatibility library, and hence had performance problems.

WordPerfect failed to gain a large user base, and as part of Corel's change of strategic direction following a (non-voting) investment by Microsoft, WordPerfect for Linux was discontinued and its Linux distribution was sold to Xandros. In April 2004, Corel re-released WordPerfect 8.1 (the last Linux-native version) with some updates, as a "proof of concept" and to test the Linux market. As of 2011, WordPerfect for Linux is not available for purchase.

As of 2023, WordPerfect for Linux (also known as xwp) can still be run on modern distros.

Linux applications may use the libwpd library to convert WordPerfect documents.

=== iOS ===
A WordPerfect X7 app for iOS was released in 2014, but it was merely remote desktop software that connected to a Corel-hosted WordPerfect for Windows session. It was billed as a "Limited Free Trial" and was eventually discontinued by Corel.

== Unicode and Asian language editing ==
WordPerfect lacks support for Unicode, which limits its usefulness in a number of markets outside North America and Western Europe. Despite pleas from long-time users, this feature has not yet been implemented.

For users in WordPerfect's traditional markets, the inability to deal with complex character sets, such as Asian language scripts, can cause difficulty when working on documents containing those characters. However, later versions have provided better compliance with interface conventions, file compatibility, and even Word interface emulation.

However, WordPerfect X4 was reported to be able to import IPA character set, and copy and paste works as long as the pastes into WP are done via Paste Special > Unicode command. Publishing to PDF from WordPerfect embeds the WP-phonetic font together with the Unicode-compatible font.

== Reception ==
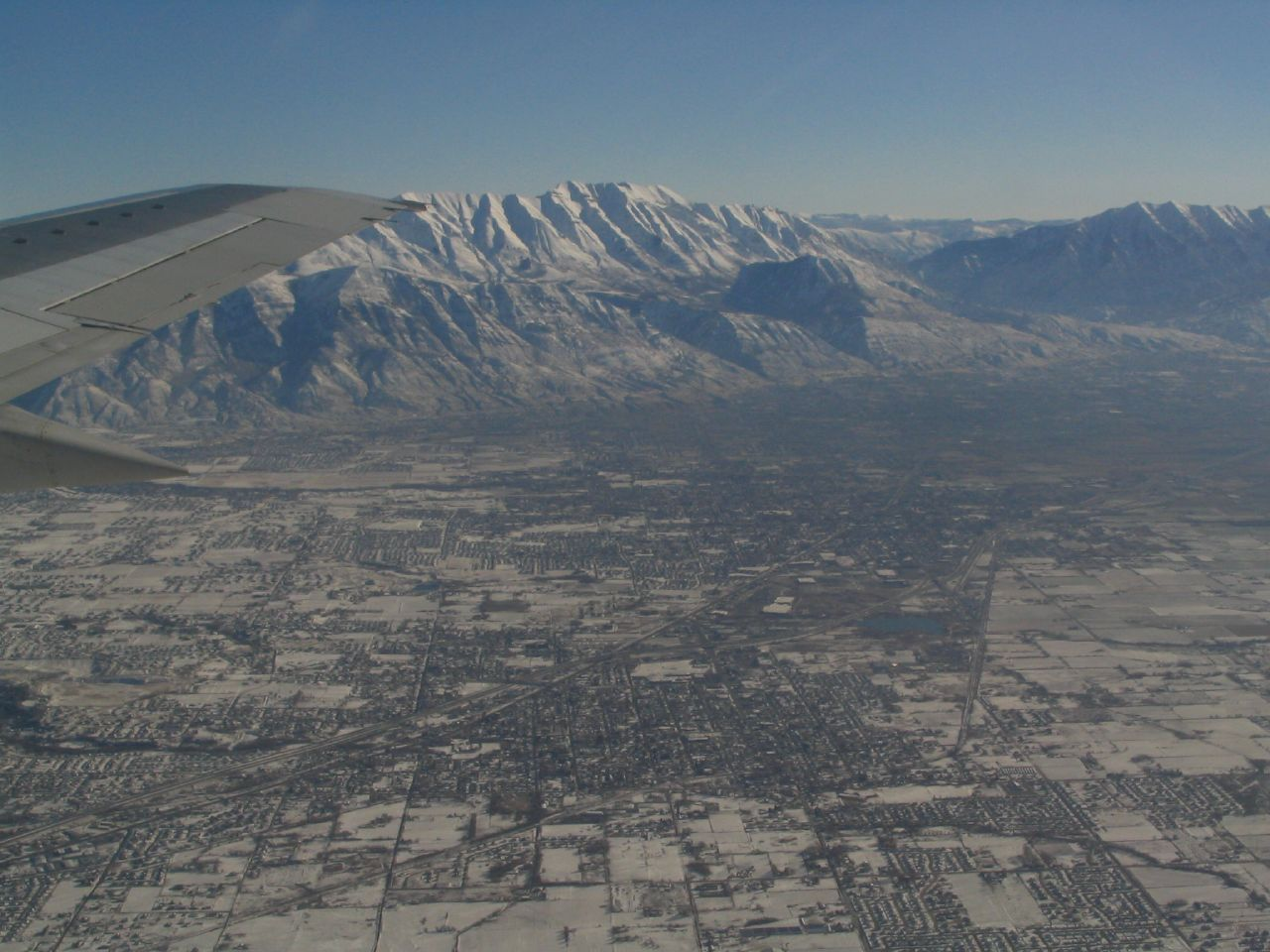
While WordPerfect was no longer an independent company after 1994, it (along with Novell) was instrumental in making Utah Valley a focus for software development.

PC Magazine stated in March 1983 that "WordPerfect is very impressive, a more than full-featured program with a few truly state-of-the-art goodies tucked into the package". It cited WordPerfect's inclusion of mail merge, footnotes, and macros—all missing from WordStar—as well as "virtually every ... feature that one ought to expect from a higher-priced program" including find-and-replace, bold and underline display, and automatic paragraph reflow. Byte in December 1984 noted the application's built-in print buffer, ability to show bold, underline, and centered text, and extensive math capabilities. It criticized the quality of the spell checker and difficult tab settings, but concluded that "its powerful capabilities far outweigh the problems mentioned".

Stating in The Yale Review that they were "not at all the best known", Edward Mendelson in 1985 recommended WordPerfect 4.0 as among the three best word processors for "journalists, essayists, and scholars, novelists, dramatists, and poets". Despite "serious flaws [and] special varieties of annoyance and illogic", he said that they "are each far superior to anything else available". "I have finally found a program that dethrones WordStar", the Orlando Sentinel wrote in August 1985: "It does everything more than competently, and its shortcomings are minor". The author praised the software's speed, ease of learning, "uncluttered screen", autosave, "not excessive" hardware requirements, and "as little as $219 by mail order" price. While wishing for split screen, undo, and the ability to save ASCII files without linefeeds, the review concluded "I'm happy as an otter on a fresh mudslide". Compute! in August 1985 called WordPerfect "excellent". It especially praised the clean, uncluttered screen and fast spell checker. Mendelson in spring 1986 said that version 4.1 had "all its old virtues intact and many new ones added".

Jerry Pournelle in October 1987 said that WordPerfect "is darned good". While preferring Q&A Write in some ways, he said that "WordPerfect is a good professional writer's tool, and they keep updating and adding features as I suggest them". PC in 1988 named WordPerfect 4.2 an Editor's Choice among 55 tested word processors. Mendelson wrote that its "dozens of small conveniences add up to one of the most agreeable programs to work with". Citing fonts, proportional printing, and cumbersome copy-and-paste as the only deficiencies, he concluded that WordPerfect had supplanted WordStar as the industry standard "with good reason". Noting the spell checker's size and the company's "excellent track record of supporting its software", Antic in May 1988 concluded that "If you want to own the most power-packed word processor available for the ST today, and can live with the relative complexity needed for harnessing this power, WordPerfect is what you've been waiting for."

Compute! in December 1993 said that 6.0 for DOS "offers the best of versions 5.1 for DOS and 5.2 for Windows and adds several new features of its own". Noting that "screen redraws can be painfully slow" in graphics mode, the magazine recommended WordPerfect to those who "need more from your word processor than just word processing" with "a fast 386 or better".

== See also ==
- Ability Office – repackaged and sold as Corel Home Office and Corel Office Suite by Corel, but using Ability and Microsoft's file formats instead of WordPerfect Office file formats
- Comparison of office suites
- Comparison of word processors
- List of office suites
- List of word processors
- Office Open XML software
- OpenDocument software
