= Grammar checker =

Computer program that verifies written text for grammatical correctness

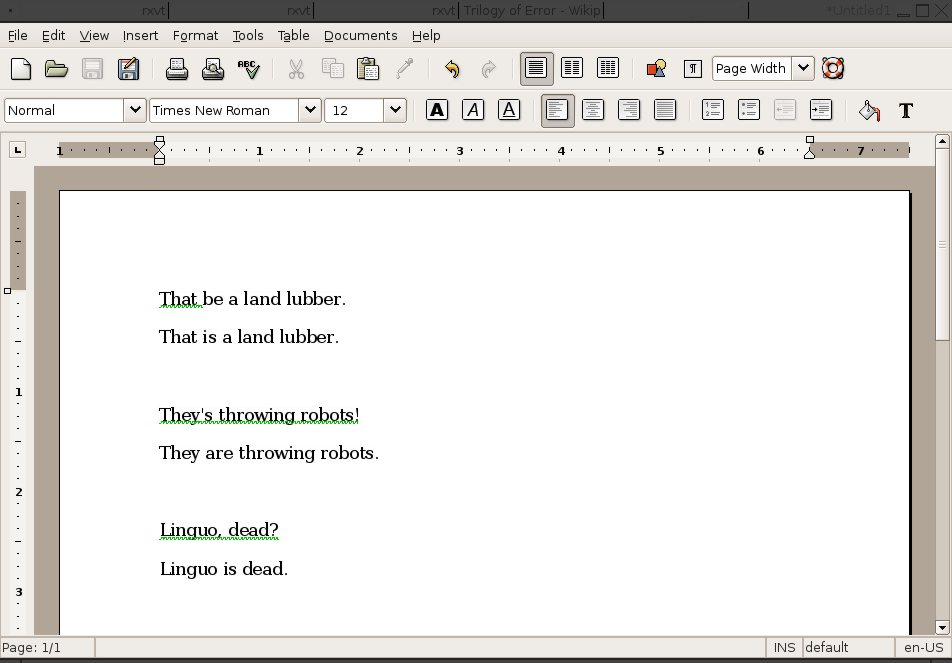
AbiWord checks English grammar using link grammar.

A grammar checker, in computing terms, is a program, or part of a program, that attempts to verify written text for grammatical correctness. Grammar checkers are most often implemented as a feature of a larger program, such as a word processor, but are also available as a stand-alone application that can be activated from within programs that work with editable text.

The implementation of a grammar checker makes use of natural language processing.

== History ==
The earliest "grammar checkers" were programs that checked for punctuation and style inconsistencies, rather than a complete range of possible grammatical errors. The first system was called Writer's Workbench, and was a set of writing tools included with Unix systems as far back as the 1970s. The whole Writer's Workbench package included several separate tools to check for various writing problems. The "diction" tool checked for wordy, trite, clichéd or misused phrases in a text. The tool would output a list of questionable phrases and provide suggestions for improving the writing. The "style" tool analyzed the writing style of a given text. It performed a number of readability tests on the text and output the results, and gave some statistical information about the sentences of the text.

Aspen Software of Albuquerque, New Mexico released the earliest version of a diction and style checker for personal computers, Grammatik, in 1981. Grammatik was first available for a Radio Shack - TRS-80, and soon had versions for CP/M and the IBM PC. Reference Software International of San Francisco, California, acquired Grammatik in 1985. Development of Grammatik continued, and it became an actual grammar checker that could detect writing errors beyond simple style checking.

Other early diction and style checking programs included Punctuation & Style, Correct Grammar, RightWriter and PowerEdit. While all the earliest programs started as simple diction and style checkers, all eventually added various levels of language processing, and developed some level of true grammar checking capability.

Until 1992, grammar checkers were sold as add-on programs. There were a large number of different word processing programs available at that time, with WordPerfect and Microsoft Word the top two in market share. In 1992, Microsoft decided to add grammar checking as a feature of Word, and licensed CorrecText, a grammar checker from Houghton Mifflin that had not yet been marketed as a standalone product. WordPerfect answered Microsoft's move by acquiring Reference Software, and the direct descendant of Grammatik is still included with WordPerfect.

As of 2019, grammar checkers are built into systems like Google Docs, browser extensions like Grammarly and Qordoba, desktop applications like Ginger, free and open-source software like LanguageTool, and text editor plugins like those available from WebSpellChecker Software.

== Technical issues ==
The earliest writing style programs checked for wordy, trite, clichéd, or misused phrases in a text. This process was based on simple pattern matching. The heart of the program was a list of many hundreds or thousands of phrases that are considered poor writing by many experts. The list of questionable phrases included alternative wording for each phrase. The checking program would simply break text into sentences, check for any matches in the phrase dictionary, flag suspect phrases and show an alternative. These programs could also perform some mechanical checks. For example, they would typically flag doubled words, doubled punctuation, some capitalization errors, and other simple mechanical mistakes.

True grammar checking is more complex. While a programming language has a very specific syntax and grammar, this is not so for natural languages. One can write a somewhat complete formal grammar for a natural language, but there are usually so many exceptions in real usage that a formal grammar is of minimal help in writing a grammar checker. One of the most important parts of a natural language grammar checker is a dictionary of all the words in the language, along with the part of speech of each word. The fact that a natural word may be used as any one of several parts of speech (such as "free" being used as an adjective, adverb, noun, or verb) greatly increases the complexity of any grammar checker.

A grammar checker will find each sentence in a text, look up each word in the dictionary, and then attempt to parse the sentence into a form that matches a grammar. Using various rules, the program can then detect various errors, such as agreement in tense, number, word order, and so on. It is also possible to detect some stylistic problems with the text. For example, some popular style guides such as The Elements of Style deprecate excessive use of the passive voice. Grammar checkers may attempt to identify passive sentences and suggest an active-voice alternative.

The software elements required for grammar checking are closely related to some of the development issues that need to be addressed for speech recognition software. In voice recognition, parsing can be used to help predict which word is most likely intended, based on part of speech and position in the sentence. In grammar checking, the parsing is used to detect words that fail to follow accepted grammar usage.

Recently, research has focused on developing algorithms which can recognize grammar errors based on the context of the surrounding words.

== Criticism ==
Grammar checkers are considered a type of foreign language writing aid which non-native speakers can use to proofread their writings as such programs endeavor to identify syntactical errors. However, as with other computerized writing aids such as spell checkers, popular grammar checkers are often criticized when they fail to spot errors and incorrectly flag correct text as erroneous. The linguist Geoffrey K. Pullum argued in 2007 that they were generally so inaccurate as to do more harm than good: "for the most part, accepting the advice of a computer grammar checker on your prose will make it much worse, sometimes hilariously incoherent."

== See also ==
- Spell checker
- Link grammar
