= Cœdès transliteration of Thai =

The transliteration system referred to as Cœdès system is a reversible transliteration for Thai and Khmer, developed by Georges Cœdès and published in table form by his student Uraisi Varasarin.

This system is used in scholarly research. It tends to be favoured over the Royal Thai General System of Transcription—the official scheme promulgated by the Royal Thai Institute—because the latter is not reversible, as it underrepresents vowel quality and quantity.

G. Cœdès's transliteration system inherits some transliteration habits for scripts of Indian origin, such as the use of ṅ for the velar nasal, and the use of macron. It also reflects typographical convenience on a typewriter, such as the use of underlining.

== Consonants ==
Thai	ก	ข	ฃ	ค	ฅ	ฆ	ง	จ	ฉ	ช	ซ	ฌ	ญ		
transliteration	k	kh	k͟h	g	g̱	gh	ṅ	c	ch	j	j̱	jh	ñ		
Thai	ฎ	ฏ	ฐ	ฑ	ฒ	ณ	ด	ต	ถ	ท	ธ	น			
transliteration	ṭ	ṭ̱	ṭh	ḍ	ḍh	ṇ	t	ṯ	th	d	dh	n			
Thai	บ	ป	ผ	ฝ	พ	ฟ	ภ	ม							
transliteration	p	p̱	ph	p̱h	b	ḇ	bh	m							
Thai	ย	ร	ฤ	ล	ฦ	ว	ศ	ษ	ส	ห	ฬ	อ	ฮ	ฤๅ	ฦๅ
transliteration	y	r	ṛ	l	ḷ	v	ś	ṡ	s	h	ḻ	a	ẖ	ṝ	ḹ

== Vowels ==
Thai	-ะ	-า	อิ	อี	อึ	อื	อุ	อู	เ-	เ-ะ	แ-ะ	แ-
transliteration	a	ā	i	ī	ị	ị̄	u	ū	e	eḥ	eeḥ	ee

Thai	โ-ะ	โ-	เ-อะ	เ-อ	เ-าะ	-อ	เอือะ	เอือ	เอียะ	เอีย	อัวะ	อัว
transliteration	oḥ	o	eaḥ	ea, ei	ọh	ạ	ị̄eaḥ	ị̄ea	ị̄eyḥ	ị̄ey	văḥ	vă, va

Thai	อำ	ไ-	ใ-	เ-า
transliteration	āṃ	ai	a͟i	au

== Tones ==
The Thai script was devised at a stage when the language contrasted three tones. This required two marks, one of the three tones being left unmarked. These were supplemented by two other tonal marks. G. Cœdès did not propose a standardized way to transliterate all four tone marks. For a transliteration system that aims at exhaustivity, it seemed useful to have a system that covers all five types of tones, including explicit marking for the absence of tone mark. The following proposal was put forward by Krisda Tan Sirijunto and Alexis Michaud in 2015.

Thai	เสียงสามัญ	เสียงเอก	เสียงโท	เสียงตรี	เสียงจัตวา
description	no tone mark	Mai Ek (tone 1)	Mai Tho (tone 2)	Mai Tri	Mai Cattawa
transliteration	ka⁰	ka¹	ka²	ka³	ka⁴
Unicode symbol	U+2070 SUPERSCRIPT ZERO	U+00B9 SUPERSCRIPT ONE	U+00B2 SUPERSCRIPT TWO	U+00B3 SUPERSCRIPT THREE	U+2074 SUPERSCRIPT FOUR

== See also ==
- Romanization of Thai
- Romanization of Lao
- Royal Thai General System of Transcription
