= Romanization of Thai =

Representation of the Thai language in Latin script

There are many systems for the romanization of the Thai language, i.e. representing the language in Latin script. These include systems of transliteration, and transcription. The most seen system in public space is Royal Thai General System of Transcription (RTGS)—the official scheme promulgated by the Royal Thai Institute. It is based on spoken Thai, but disregards tone, vowel length and a few minor sound distinctions.

The international standard ISO 11940 is a transliteration system, preserving all aspects of written Thai adding diacritics to the Roman letters. Its extension ISO 11940-2 defines a simplified transcription reflecting the spoken language. It is almost identical to RTGS. Libraries in English-speaking countries use the ALA-LC Romanization.

In practice, often non-standard and inconsistent romanizations are used, especially for proper nouns and personal names. This is reflected, for example, in the name Suvarnabhumi Airport, which is spelled based on direct transliteration of the name's Sanskrit root. Language learning books often use their own proprietary systems, none of which are used in Thai public space.

== Transliteration ==
An international standard, ISO 11940, was devised with transliteration in academic context as one of its main goals.

It is based on Thai orthography, and defines a reversible transliteration by means of adding a host of diacritics to the Latin letters. The result bears little resemblance to the pronunciation of the words and is hardly ever seen in public space.

Some scholars use the Cœdès system for Thai transliteration defined by George Cœdès (1886–1969), in the version published by his student Uraisi Varasarin. In this system, the same transliteration is proposed for Thai and Khmer whenever possible.

== Transcription ==
The Royal Thai System of Transcription, usually referred to as RTGS uses only unadorned Roman letters to reflect spoken Thai. It does not indicate tone and vowel length. Furthermore it merges International Phonetic Alphabet (IPA) /o/ and /ɔ/ into ⟨o⟩ and IPA /tɕ/ and /tɕʰ/ into ⟨ch⟩. This system is widely used in Thailand, especially for road signs.

The ISO standard ISO 11940-2 defines a set of rules to transform the result of ISO 11940 into a simplified transcription. In the process, it rearranges the letters to correspond to Thai pronunciation, but it discards information about vowel length and syllable tone and the distinction between IPA /o/ and /ɔ/.

These are not reversible, as they do not indicate tone and underrepresent vowel quality and quantity. Graphemic distinctions between letters for Indic voiced, voiceless, and breathy-voiced consonants have also been neutralised.

== History ==
=== American missionary romanization ===
In 1842, Mission Press in Bangkok published two pamphlets on transliteration: One for transcribing Greek and Hebrew names into Thai, and the other, "A plan for Romanising the Siamese Language". The principle underlying the transcription scheme was phonetic, i.e. it represented pronunciation, rather than etymology, but also maintained some of the features of Thai orthography.

Several diacritics were used: The acute accent was used to indicate long vowels, where Thai script had two different vowel signs for the vowel sounds: อิ was transliterated as i, while อี was transliterated as í. The exception to this rule was the signs for /ɯ/: อึ was transliterated as ŭ, while อื was transliterated as ü. The various signs for /ɤ/, were transliterated as ë. The grave accent was used to indicate other vowels: /ɔ/ was transliterated as ò, while /ɛ/ became è. ะ was transliterated with a hyphen, so that กะ became ka-, and แกะ became kè-. Aspirated consonants were indicated by the use of an apostrophe: บ b /b/, ป p /p/ and พ p’ /pʰ/. This included separating the affricates จ ch /tɕ/ and ช ch’ /tɕʰ/.

=== Proposed system by the Siam Society ===
For many years, the Siam Society was discussing a uniform way in which to transliterate Thai using Latin script. Numerous schemes were created by its individual members and published in its journal, including one tentative scheme by King Rama VI, published in 1913. The same year, the society published a proposal for "transliterating Siamese words", which had been designed by several of its members working together. The system was dual, in that it separated Sanskrit and Pali loans, which were to be transliterated according to the Hunterian system, however, an exception was made for those words which had become so integrated into Thai that their Sanskrit and Pali roots had been forgotten. For proper Thai words, the system is somewhat similar to the present RTGS, for instance with regards to the differentiation of consonants' initial and final sounds. Some of the major differences are:

- Aspiration would be marked with spiritus asper placed after the consonant, so that ข and ค would both be transliterated as k῾ (whereas RTGS transliterates them as kh).
- Long vowels were indicated by adding a macron to the corresponding sign for the short vowel.
- The vowels อึ and อื (/ɯ/ and /ɯː/) would be transliterated using an umlauted u, respectively ü and ǖ (the macron is placed above the umlaut).
- The vowel แอ would be transliterated as ë, whereas RTGS transliterates it as ae.
- When ะ indicates a shortened vowel, it would be indicated with the letter ḥ, so that แอะ would be transliterated as ëḥ.
- The vowel ออ /ɔː/, would be distinguished from โอ with a caron: ǒ. Its corresponding short form เอาะ /ɔ/, would be transliterated as ǒḥ.
- The vowel เออ would be transliterated as ö.

As the system was meant to provide an easy reference for the European who was not familiar with the Thai language, the system aimed at only using a single symbol to represent each distinct sound. Similarly, tones were not marked, as it was felt that the "learned speaker" would be so familiar with the Thai script, as to not need a transliteration scheme to find the proper pronunciation.

King Vajiravudh, however, was not pleased with the system, contending that when different consonants were used in the final position, it was because they represented different sounds, such that a final -ล would, by an educated speaker, be pronounced differently from a final -น. He also opposed using a phonetic Thai spelling for any word of Sanskrit or Pali origin, arguing that these should be transliterated in their Indic forms, so as to preserve their etymology. While most of Vajiravudh's criticisms focused on the needs and abilities of learned readers, he argued against the use of spiritus asper to indicate aspiration, as it would mean "absolutely nothing to the lay reader".

== See also ==
- ISO 11940
- ISO 11940-2
- Romanization of Lao
- Royal Thai General System of Transcription
