= Thai language =

Kra–Dai language

Thai
- Central Thai, Siamese
- ภาษาไทย, Phasa Thai ภาษาไทยกลาง ภาษาสยาม ภาษากลาง
- "Phasa Thai" (literally meaning "Thai language") written in Thai script
- Pronunciation: [pʰāːsǎːtʰāj]
- Region: Thailand (Central Thailand and Thai Chinese enclaves throughout the country); Cambodia (Koh Kong); Myanmar (Tanintharyi)
- Ethnicity: Central Thai, Thai Chinese, Mon, Lao Wiang, Phuan
- Speakers: L1: 27 million (2024): L2: 44 million (2024); Total: 71 million (2024)
- Language family: Kra–Dai: Kam–Tai; Tai; Southwestern; Chiang Saen; Thai
- Writing system: Thai script; Thai Braille; Khom Thai (religious use)

Official status
- Official language in: Thailand
- Recognised minority language in: Cambodia; Laos; Malaysia; Myanmar
- Regulated by: Royal Society of Thailand

Language codes
- ISO 639-1: th
- ISO 639-2: tha
- ISO 639-3: tha
- Glottolog: thai1261
- Linguasphere: 47-AAA-b
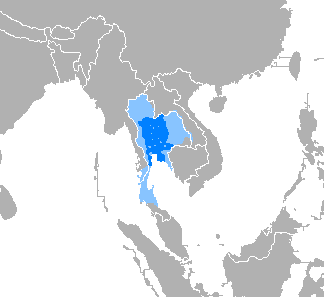
- Majority Minority

A native Thai speaker, recorded in Bangkok

Thai, (Note: In Thai: ภาษาไทย Phasa Thai) or Central Thai (Note: In Thai: ภาษาไทยถิ่นกลาง Phasa Thai Klang; not to be confused with Central Tai) (historically Siamese; (Note: In Thai: ภาษาสยาม Phasa Sayam) (Note: Although "Thai" and "Central Thai" have become more common, the older term, "Siamese", is still used by linguists, especially when it is being distinguished from other Tai languages (Diller 2008:6). "Proto-Thai" is, for example, the ancestor of all of Southwestern Tai, not just Siamese (Rischel 1998).) Thai: ภาษาไทย), is a Tai language of the Kra–Dai language family spoken by the Central Thai, Mon, Lao Wiang, and Phuan people in Central Thailand and the vast majority of Thai Chinese enclaves throughout the country. It is the sole official language of Thailand.

Thai is the most spoken of over 60 languages of Thailand by both number of native and overall speakers. Over half of its vocabulary is derived from or borrowed from Pali, Sanskrit, Mon and Old Khmer. It is a tonal and analytic language. Thai has a complex orthography and system of relational markers. Spoken Thai, depending on standard sociolinguistic factors such as age, gender, class, spatial proximity, and the urban/rural divide, is partly mutually intelligible with Lao, Isan, and some fellow Thai topolects. These languages are written with slightly different scripts, but are linguistically similar and effectively form a dialect continuum.

The Thai language is spoken by over 70 million people in Thailand as of 2024. Moreover, most Thais in the northern (Lanna), the Southern (Tai) and the northeastern (Isan) parts of the country today are bilingual speakers of Central Thai and their respective regional dialects because Central Thai is the language of television, education, news reporting, and all forms of media. A recent research found that the speakers of the Northern Thai language (also known as Phasa Mueang or Kham Mueang) have become so few, as most people in northern Thailand now invariably speak Standard Thai, so that they are now using mostly Central Thai words and only seasoning their speech with the "Kham Mueang" accent. Standard Thai is based on the register of the educated classes by Central Thai and ethnic minorities in the area along the ring surrounding the Metropolis.

In addition to Central Thai, Thailand is home to other related Tai languages. Although most linguists classify these dialects as related but distinct languages, native speakers often identify them as regional variants or dialects of the "same" Thai language, or as "different kinds of Thai". As a dominant language in all aspects of society in Thailand, Thai initially saw gradual and later widespread adoption as a second language among the country's minority ethnic groups from the mid-late Ayutthaya period onward. Ethnic minorities today are predominantly bilingual, speaking Thai alongside their native language or dialect.

== Classification ==
Standard Thai is classified as one of the Chiang Saen languages—others being Northern Thai, Southern Thai and numerous smaller languages, which together with the Northwestern Tai and Lao-Phutai languages, form the Southwestern branch of Tai languages. The Tai languages are a branch of the Kra–Dai language family, which encompasses a large number of indigenous languages spoken in an arc from Hainan and Guangxi south through Laos and Northern Vietnam to the Cambodian border.

Standard Thai is the principal language of education and government and spoken throughout Thailand. The standard is based on the dialect of the central Thai people, and it is written in the Thai script.

Example of divergence among the Kra-Dai languages

- Kra-Dai
  - Hlai languages
  - Kam-Sui languages
  - Kra languages
  - Be language
  - Tai languages
    - Northern Tai languages
    - Central Tai languages
    - Southwestern Tai languages
      - Northwestern Tai languages
        - Khamti language
        - Tai Lue language
        - Shan language
        - others
      - Chiang Saen languages
        - Northern Thai language
        - Sukhothai language
          - Thai language
          - Southern Thai language
      - Lao‑Phuthai languages
        - Tai Yo language
        - Phuthai language
        - Lao language (PDR Lao, Isan language)

== History ==
Thai has undergone various historical sound changes. Some of the most significant changes occurred during the evolution from Old Thai to modern Thai. The Thai writing system has an eight-century history, and many of these changes—especially in consonants and tones—are evidenced in the modern orthography.

=== Early spread ===
According to the Ming dynasty Chinese source Yingya Shenglan (1405–1433) written by Ma Huan, the language of the Xiānluó (暹羅) or Ayutthaya Kingdom (Note: Xiānluó was the Chinese name for Ayutthaya, a kingdom created by the merger of Lavo and Sukhothai or Suvarnabhumi.) somewhat resembled the local patois pronounced in Guangdong. Ayutthaya, the capital of Thailand from 1351 to 1767 CE, was a bilingual society from its inception where both Thai and Khmer were spoken. This bilingualism was likely strengthened and maintained by the large number of Khmer-speaking captives the Thais relocated from Angkor Thom following their military victories in 1369, 1388, and 1431.

Gradually, toward the end of the Ayutthaya period, a language shift took place as Khmer fell out of everyday use. Descendants of bilingual families ultimately transitioned to using only Thai. During this shift, an abundance of Khmer elements were transferred into Thai, permeating all aspects of the language. Consequently, the Thai of the late Ayutthaya period—which later evolved into Rattanakosin or Bangkok Thai—was a thorough mixture of Thai and Khmer. During this era, there were more Khmer words in use than Tai cognates. Khmer grammatical rules were actively used to coin new disyllabic and polysyllabic words and phrases, and Khmer expressions, sayings, and proverbs were assimilated into Thai through direct transference.

Thais borrowed and expanded their royal vocabulary (rajasap) utilizing Khmer linguistic rules. They later further developed this vocabulary to suit their cultural environment, integrating Thai and Pali (the latter introduced via Theravada Buddhism). An analysis of the Ayutthaya royal vocabulary reveals that three linguistic elements—Thai, Khmer, and Khmero-Indic—worked closely together in both formulaic expressions and normal discourse. Because Indic elements had already been adapted into the Khmer system prior to Thai borrowing, Khmero-Indic can effectively be classified alongside the Khmer category.

=== Old Thai ===
Sample from the Ramkhamhaeng Steele
Sukhothai Script	Modern Thai Transcribed	IPA Sukhothai	Meaning
	พ่กูชื่สรีอีนทราทีตยแม่กูชื่นางเสือง พี่กูชื่บานเมืองตูพี่น้องท้องดยว ห้าคนผู้ชายสามผู้ญิงโสงพี่เผือ ผู้อ้ายตายจากเผือตยมแฏ่ญงงเลก	bɔː˩ kuː dʑɯː˩ siː.ʔiːn.draː.diːt mɛː˩ kuː dʑɯː˩ naːŋ sɯaŋ biː˩ kuː dʑɯː˩ baːn.mɯaŋ tuː biː˩ nɔːŋ˥ dɔːŋ˥ ʔdiaw haː˥ gɔn pʰuː˥.dʑaːj saːm pʰuː˥.ɲiŋ soːŋ biː˩ pʰɯa pʰuː˥.ʔaːj˥ taːj tɕaːk pʰɯa tiam tɛː˩ ɲaŋ lek .....	My father's name is Sri Indraditya, My mother's name is lady Sueang. My older brother's name is Ban Mueang. We are five siblings from the same womb. three boys and two girls. Our eldest brother passed away. when we were young.... [text continues]
Modern Thai Approximate Pronunciation and Transliteration
บ่อ กู จื่อ ซีอีนดราดีต แหม่ กู จื่อ นางเซือง บี่ กู จื่อ บานเมือง ตู บี่ น่อง ด้อง เดียว ห้า กอน ผู้จาย ซาม ผู้ญิง โซง บี่ เบือ ผู้อ้าย ตาย จาก เพือ เตียม แต่ ญัง เล็ก bo ku jue Si-Indradit mae ku jue Nang Sueang bi ku jue Ban Mueang tu bi nong dong diao ha gon phujai sam phunying song bi phuea phu-ai tai chak phuea tiam tae nyang lek (voiced stops are approximated as unvoiced in this case due to its absence in modern Thai)

Old Thai had a three-way tone distinction on "live syllables" (those not ending in a stop), with no possible tonal distinction on "dead syllables" (those ending in a stop, i.e., either /p/, /t/, /k/ or the glottal stop that automatically closes syllables otherwise ending in a short vowel).

There was a two-way voiced versus voiceless distinction among all fricative and sonorant consonants, and up to a four-way distinction among stops and affricates. The maximal four-way distinction occurred in labials (/p pʰ b ʔb/) and denti-alveolars (/t tʰ d ʔd/). A three-way distinction existed among velars (/k kʰ ɡ/) and palatals (/tɕ tɕʰ dʑ/), with the glottalized member of each set apparently missing.

The major change between Old and modern Thai was driven by the loss of the voicing distinction and the concomitant tone split. This transition likely occurred between 1300 and 1600 CE, possibly happening at different times across different parts of the Thai-speaking area. During this period, all voiced–voiceless pairs of consonants lost their voicing distinction:

- Plain voiced stops (/b d ɡ dʑ/) became voiceless aspirated stops (/pʰ tʰ kʰ tɕʰ/). (Note: The glottalized stops /ʔb ʔd/ were unaffected, as they were treated in every respect like voiceless unaspirated stops due to the initial glottal stop. These stops are often described in the modern language as phonemically plain stops /b d/, but the glottalization is still commonly heard.)
- Voiced fricatives became voiceless.
- Voiceless sonorants became voiced.

However, in the process of these mergers, the former voicing distinction was transferred into a new set of tonal distinctions. In essence, every tone in Old Thai split into two new tones: a lower-pitched tone corresponding to a syllable that formerly began with a voiced consonant, and a higher-pitched tone corresponding to a syllable that formerly began with a voiceless consonant (including glottalized stops). An additional complication is that formerly voiceless unaspirated stops and affricates (original /p t k tɕ ʔb ʔd/) also caused original tone 1 to lower, but had no such effect on original tones 2 or 3.

The aforementioned consonant mergers and tone splits account for the complex relationship between spelling and sound in modern Thai. Modern "low"-class consonants were voiced in Old Thai, and the terminology "low" reflects the resulting lower tone variants. Modern "mid"-class consonants were voiceless unaspirated stops or affricates in Old Thai—precisely the class that triggered lowering in original tone 1 but not tones 2 or 3. Modern "high"-class consonants represent the remaining voiceless consonants in Old Thai (voiceless fricatives, voiceless sonorants, and voiceless aspirated stops).

The three most common tone "marks" (the lack of any tone mark, as well as the two marks termed mai ek and mai tho) represent the three original tones of Old Thai. The complex modern relationship between a tone mark and its actual tone is due to the various tonal changes that have occurred since then. Following the tone split, the tones shifted in their actual phonetic representation to the point where the former relationship between lower and higher tonal variants has been completely obscured. Furthermore, the six tones that resulted from the splitting of Old Thai's three tones have since merged into five in standard Thai; the lower variant of former tone 2 merged with the higher variant of former tone 3 to become the modern "falling" tone. (Note: Modern Lao, Isan and northern Thai dialects are often described as having six tones, but these are not necessarily due to the preservation of the original six tones resulting from the tone split. For example, in standard Lao, both the high and low variants of Old Thai tone 2 merged; however, the mid-class variant of tone 1 came to be pronounced differently from either the high-class or low-class variants, and all three eventually became phonemic due to further changes (e.g. /kr/ > /kʰ/). For similar reasons, Lao has developed more than two tonal distinctions in "dead" syllables.)

==== Old Thai (Sukhothai) consonant inventory ====
	Labial				Dental/ Alveolar				(Alveolo-) Palatal				Velar			Glottal
Nasal	[m̊] หม		[m] ม		[n̊] หน		[n] น, ณ		[ɲ̊] หญ		[ɲ] ญ		[ŋ̊] หง		[ŋ] ง	
Plosive/ Affricate	[p] ป	[pʰ] ผ	[b] พ, ภ	[ʔb] บ	[t] ฏ, ต	[tʰ] ฐ, ถ	[d] ท, ธ	[ʔd] ฎ, ด	[tɕ] จ	[tɕʰ] ฉ	[dʑ] ช		[k] ก	[kʰ] ข	[g] ค, ฆ	[ʔ] อ
Fricative	[f] ฝ		[v] ฟ		[s] ศ, ษ, ส		[z]~[ʑ] ซ						[x] ฃ		[ɣ] ฅ	[h] ห
Trill					[r̊] หร		[r] ร									
Approximant	[ẘ] หว		[w] ว		[l̥] หล		[l] ล		[j̊] หย		[j] ย	[ʔj] อย				

==== Historical Sukhothai pronunciation ====
Letters	IPA	Word in Sukhothai (in Modern Thai script)	Pronunciation in IPA (excluding tone)	Meaning and definitions
วรรค ก | Varga Kor
ก	k	เกิด	kɤːt	v. to be born
ข	kʰ	ของ	kʰɔːŋ	n. thing
ฃ	x	ฃึ้น (ขึ้น)	xɯn	v. to go up
ค	g	ครู	gruː	n. teacher
ฅ	ɣ	ฅวาม (ความ)	ɣwaːm	n. affair; matter; content
ฆ	g	ฆ่า	gaː	v. to kill
ง	ŋ	งก	ŋok	adj. greedy
หง	ŋ̊	หงอก	ŋ̊ɔːk	v. to whiten (hair)
วรรค จ | Varga Jor
จ	tɕ	ใจ	tɕaɯ	n. heart
ฉ	tɕʰ	ฉาย	tɕʰaːj	v. to shine (on something)
ช	dʑ	ชื่อ	dʑɯː	n. name
ซ	z - ʑ	ซ้ำ	zam	adv. repeatedly
ญ	ɲ	ญวน	ɲuan	n. Vietnam (archaic)
หญ	ɲ̊	หญิง	ɲ̊iŋ	n. woman
วรรค รฏ | Varga Ra Tor
ฎ	ʔd	ฎีกา	ʔdiː.kaː	n. petition notice
ฏ	t	ฏาร	taː.raʔ	n. Ganymede
ฐ	tʰ	ฐาน	tʰaːn	n. base, platform
ณ	n	เณร	neːn	n. novice monk
วรรค ต | Varga Tor
ด	ʔd	ดาว	ʔdaːw	n. star
ต	t	ตา	taː	n. eye
ถ	tʰ	ถอย	tʰɔj	v. to move back
ท	d	ทอง	dɔːŋ	n. gold
ธ	d	ธุระ	du.raʔ	n. business; affairs; errands
น	n	น้ำ	naːm	n. water
หน	n̊	หนู	n̊uː	n. mouse
วรรค ป | Varga Por
บ	ʔb	บ้าน	ʔbaːn	n. house
ป	p	ปลา	plaː	n. fish
ผ	pʰ	ผึ้ง	pʰɯŋ	n. bee
ฝ	f	ฝัน	fan	n. dream
พ	b	พ่อ	bɔː	n. father
ฟ	v	ฟัน	van	n. tooth
ภ	b	ภาษา	baː.saː	n. language
ม	m	แม่	mɛː	n. mother
หม	m̊	หมา	m̊aː	n. dog
อวรรค | Avarga
อย	ʔj	อย่า	ʔjaː	adv. do not
ย	j	เย็น	jen	adj. cold
หย	j̊	เหยียบ	j̊iap	v. to step on
ร	r	รัก	rak	v. to love
หร	r̊	หรือ	r̊ɯː	conj. or
ล	l	ลม	lom	n. wind
หล	l̥	หล่อ	l̥ɔː	adj. handsome
ว	w	วัน	wan	n. day
หว	ẘ	หวี	ẘiː	n. comb
ศ	s	ศาล	saːn	n. court of law
ษ	s	ฤๅษรี (ฤๅษี)	rɯː.siː	n. hermit
ส	s	สวย	suaj	adj. beautiful
อ	ʔ	อ้าย	ʔaːj	n. first born son

==== Early Old Thai ====
Early Old Thai also apparently had velar fricatives /x ɣ/ as distinct phonemes. These were represented by the now-obsolete letters ฃ kho khuat and ฅ kho khon, respectively. During the Old Thai period, these sounds merged into the corresponding stops /kʰ ɡ/, causing the use of these letters to become unstable.

At some point in the history of Thai, an alveolo-palatal nasal phoneme /ɲ/ also existed, inherited from Proto-Tai. The letter ญ yo ying is used to represent an alveolo-palatal nasal in words borrowed from Sanskrit and Pali; it is currently pronounced /j/ at the beginning of a syllable and /n/ at the end of a syllable. Most native Thai words reconstructed as beginning with /ɲ/ are also pronounced /j/ in modern Thai, but they are generally spelled with ย yo yak, which consistently represents /j/. This suggests that the shift of /ɲ/ > /j/ in native words occurred in the pre-literary period. It remains unclear whether Sanskrit and Pali words beginning with /ɲ/ were borrowed directly with a /j/ sound, or whether a /ɲ/ was introduced and subsequently followed by a second change of /ɲ/ > /j/. The northeastern Thai dialect Isan and the Lao language still preserve the phoneme /ɲ/, which is represented in the Lao script by ຍ, as in the word ຍຸງ (/ɲúŋ/, 'mosquito'). This letter is distinct from the phoneme /j/ and its Lao equivalent ຢ, seen in the word ຢາ (/jàː/, 'medicine'). The orthographic distinction has been lost in informal written Isan using the Thai script, where both sounds are represented by ย /j/.

Proto-Tai also featured a glottalized palatal sound, reconstructed as /ʔj/ by Fang-Kuei Li (1977). Corresponding Thai words are generally spelled with หย, which implies an Old Thai pronunciation of /hj/ (or /j̊/). However, a few such words are spelled อย, implying a pronunciation of /ʔj/ and suggesting that the glottalization may have persisted into the early literary period.

=== Vowel developments ===
The vowel system of modern Thai contains nine pure vowels and three centering diphthongs, each of which can occur as short or long. According to Li (1977), however, many Tai languages possess only one such short–long pair (/a aː/), and it is generally difficult or impossible to find minimal short–long pairs in Thai that involve vowels other than /a/ while maintaining consistent correspondences across the Tai family. More specifically, Li notes the following regarding Thai:

- In open syllables, only long vowels occur. (This assumes that all apparent cases of short open syllables are better described as ending in a glottal stop. This hypothesis is supported by the lack of tonal distinctions in such syllables, and the fact that a glottal stop is reconstructible across the Tai languages.)
- In closed syllables, the long high vowels /iː ɯː uː/ are rare. Where they do exist, they typically correspond to diphthongs in other Tai languages.
- In closed syllables, both short and long mid /e eː o oː/ and low /ɛ ɛː ɔ ɔː/ vowels occur. Generally, however, only words with short /e o/ and long /ɛː ɔː/ can be traced back to Proto-Tai.
- Both of the mid back unrounded vowels (/ɤ ɤː/) are rare, and words containing these sounds generally cannot be reconstructed back to Proto-Tai.

Furthermore, the vowel corresponding to the short Thai /a/ frequently has a different, often higher, quality in many Tai languages compared to the vowel corresponding to the Thai /aː/.

This evidence leads Li to posit the following:

1. Proto-Tai had a system of nine pure vowels with no length distinction, possessing approximately the same qualities as modern Thai: high /i ɯ u/, mid /e ɤ o/, and low /ɛ a ɔ/.
2. All Proto-Tai vowels lengthened in open syllables, and low vowels also lengthened in closed syllables.
3. Modern Thai largely preserved the original vowel lengths and qualities, but lowered /ɤ/ to /a/. This sound became short /a/ in closed syllables, thereby creating a phonemic length distinction between /a aː/. Eventually, length became phonemic in all other vowels as well, and a new /ɤ/ (both short and long) was introduced through a combination of borrowing and sound change. Li believes that the development of long /iː ɯː uː/ from diphthongs, and the lowering of /ɤ/ to /a/ to create a length distinction, had occurred by the time of Proto-Southwestern Tai, but the other missing modern Thai vowels had not yet developed.

Not all researchers agree with Li. Pittayaporn (2009), for example, reconstructs a similar system for Proto-Southwestern Tai but argues for the presence of a mid back unrounded vowel /ə/ (which he transcribes as /ɤ/), occurring only before final velar consonants (/k ŋ/). He also argues that the Proto-Southwestern Tai vowel length distinctions can be traced back to similar distinctions in Proto-Tai.

== Phonology ==
=== Consonants ===
==== Onset consonants ('Initials') ====
Standard Thai distinguishes three voice-onset times among plosive and affricate consonants:

- voiced
- tenuis (unvoiced, unaspirated)
- aspirated

Whereas English makes a distinction between voiced /b/ and voiceless aspirated /pʰ/, Thai distinguishes a third type of voicing, with unaspirated /p/ that occurs in English only as an allophone of /pʰ/, for example after an /s/ as in the sound of the p in "spin". There is similarly a laminal denti-alveolar /d/, /t/, /tʰ/ triplet in Thai. In the velar series there is a /k/, /kʰ/ pair and in the postalveolar series a /tɕ/, /tɕʰ/ pair, without the corresponding voiced sounds /ɡ/ and /dʑ/. (In loanwords from English, English /ɡ/ and /d͡ʒ/ are borrowed as the tenuis stops /k/ and /tɕ/.) Among some younger speakers (such as younger female speakers from Bangkok metropolian area), postalveolar series are alveolar /ts/ and /tsʰ/. Among some older speakers (such as older speakers from Maeklong river basin), they can be stops /c/ and /cʰ/, however this pronunciation is not standard. Voiced stops tend to vary from fully pulmonic to implosives. However, implosive pronunciation is rare among younger speakers due to standardization and influence of the standard dialect.

In each cell below, the first line indicates International Phonetic Alphabet (IPA), the second indicates the Thai characters in initial position. Note that several letters appearing in the same box have identical pronunciation. In such cases, one of the letters may serve as the "default", being more common and/or preferred for borrowings from English and such; for example, น in the case of "n" and ส for "s". The letter ห, the default "h" letter, is also used to help write certain tones (described below).

		Labial	Dental/ Alveolar	(Alveolo-) Palatal	Velar	Glottal
Nasal		/m/ ม	/n/ ณ, น		/ŋ/ ง	
Plosive/ Affricate	voiced	/b/ บ	/d/ ฎ, ด			
Plosive/ Affricate	tenuis	/p/ ป	/t/ ฏ, ต	/tɕ/ จ	/k/ ก	/ʔ/ อ (Note: Initial อ is silent and therefore considered as a glottal stop.)
Plosive/ Affricate	aspirated	/pʰ/ ผ, พ, ภ	/tʰ/ ฐ, ฑ, ฒ, ถ, ท, ธ	/tɕʰ/ ฉ, ช, ฌ	/kʰ/ ข, ฃ, ค, ฅ, ฆ (Note: ฃ and ฅ are no longer used. Thus, modern Thai is said to have 42 consonant letters.)	
Fricative		/f/ ฝ, ฟ	/s/ ซ, ศ, ษ, ส			/h/ ห, ฮ
Approximant		/w/ ว	/l/ ล, ฬ	/j/ ญ, ย		
Trill			/r/ ร			

==== Coda consonants ('Finals') ====
As with many languages, there is a difference in the number of possibilities for coda consonants in Thai as compared to onset consonants. In Standard Thai, only nine consonants occur in coda position: /p t k ʔ m n ŋ j w/. Additionally, all plosive sounds are unreleased, so that syllable-final /p t k/ are pronounced as [p̚], [t̚], and [k̚] respectively.

Of the consonant letters, excluding the disused ฃ and ฅ, six (ฉ ผ ฝ ห อ ฮ) cannot be used as a final and the other 36 are grouped as following.

	Labial	Alveolar	Palatal	Velar	Glottal
Nasal	/m/ ม	/n/ ญ, ณ, น, ร, ล, ฬ		/ŋ/ ง	
Plosive	/p/ บ, ป, พ, ฟ, ภ	/t/ จ, ช, ซ, ฌ, ฎ, ฏ, ฐ, ฑ, ฒ, ด, ต, ถ, ท, ธ, ศ, ษ, ส		/k/ ก, ข, ค, ฆ	/ʔ/ (Note: The glottal plosive appears at the end when no final follows a short vowel)
Approximant	/w/ ว		/j/ ย		

==== Syllable structure and consonant clusters ====
In Thai, the maximal syllable shape is CCVC. In the core vocabulary (i.e. excluding loanwords), only clusters of two consonants occur, of which there are 11 combinations:

- /kr/ (กร), /kl/ (กล), /kw/ (กว)
- /kʰr/ (ขร, คร), /kʰl/ (ขล, คล), /kʰw/ (ขว, คว)
- /pr/ (ปร), /pl/ (ปล)
- /pʰr/ (พร), /pʰl/ (ผล, พล)
- /tr/ (ตร)

The number of clusters increases in loanwords such as /tʰr/ (ทร) in อินทรา (/ʔīn.tʰrāː/, from Sanskrit indrā) or /fr/ (ฟร) in ฟรี (/frīː/, from English free); however, these usually only occur in initial position, with either /r/, /l/, or /w/ as the second consonant sound and not more than two sounds at a time. In addition, ก may be Romanized as "g" and ป as "b" in those specific clusters to distinguish them from the corresponded aspirated stops.

=== Vowels ===
The vowel nuclei of the Thai language are given in the following table. The top entry in every cell is the symbol from the International Phonetic Alphabet, the second entry gives the spelling in the Thai script, where a dotted circle (◌) indicates the position of the initial consonant after which the vowel is pronounced. A second dotted circle indicates that a final consonant follows.

Monophthongs of Thai. From Tingsabadh & Abramson (1993:25)

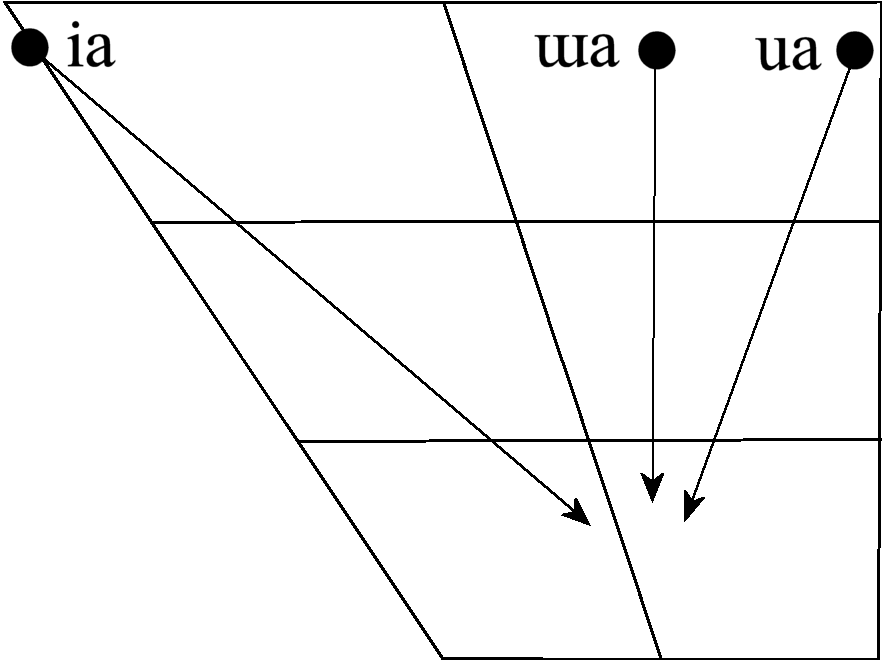
Diphthongs of Thai. From Tingsabadh & Abramson (1993:25)

	Front		Central		Back	
	short	long	short	long	short	long
Close	/i/ ◌ิ	/iː/ ◌ี	/ɯ/ ◌ึ	/ɯː/ ◌ื◌	/u/ ◌ุ	/uː/ ◌ู
Mid	/e/ เ◌ะ	/eː/ เ◌	/ɤ/ เ◌อะ	/ɤː/ เ◌อ	/o/ โ◌ะ	/oː/ โ◌
Open	/ɛ/ แ◌ะ	/ɛː/ แ◌	/a/ ◌ะ, ◌ั◌	/aː/ ◌า	/ɔ/ เ◌าะ	/ɔː/ ◌อ

Each vowel quality occurs in long–short pairs: these are distinct phonemes forming distinct words in Thai.

The long–short pairs are as follows:

Long					Short				
Thai	IPA	Example			Thai	IPA	Example		
◌า	/aː/	ฝาน	/fǎːn/	'to slice'	◌ะ	/a/	ฝัน	/fǎn/	'to dream'
◌ี	/iː/	กรีด	/krìːt/	'to cut'	◌ิ	/i/	กริช	/krìt/	'kris'
◌ู	/uː/	สูด	/sùːt/	'to inhale'	◌ุ	/u/	สุด	/sùt/	'rearmost'
เ◌	/eː/	เอน	/ʔēːn/	'to recline'	เ◌ะ	/e/	เอ็น	/ʔēn/	'tendon, ligament'
แ◌	/ɛː/	แพ้	/pʰɛ́ː/	'to be defeated'	แ◌ะ	/ɛ/	แพะ	/pʰɛ́ʔ/	'goat'
◌ื◌	/ɯː/	คลื่น	/kʰlɯ̂ːn/	'wave'	◌ึ	/ɯ/	ขึ้น	/kʰɯ̂n/	'to go up'
เ◌อ	/ɤː/	เดิน	/dɤ̄ːn/	'to walk'	เ◌อะ	/ɤ/	เงิน	/ŋɤ̄n/	'silver'
โ◌	/oː/	โค่น	/kʰôːn/	'to fell'	โ◌ะ	/o/	ข้น	/kʰôn/	'thick (soup)'
◌อ	/ɔː/	กลอง	/klɔ̄ːŋ/	'drum'	เ◌าะ	/ɔ/	กล่อง	/klɔ̀ŋ/	'box'

There are also opening and closing diphthongs in Thai, which Tingsabadh & Abramson (1993) analyze as /Vj/ and /Vw/. For purposes of determining tone, those marked with an asterisk are sometimes classified as long:

Long		Short	
Thai script	IPA	Thai script	IPA
◌าย	/aːj/	ไ◌*, ใ◌*, ไ◌ย, ◌ัย	/aj/
◌าว	/aːw/	เ◌า*	/aw/
เ◌ีย	/ia/	เ◌ียะ	/iaʔ/
–	–	◌ิว	/iw/
◌ัว	/ua/	◌ัวะ	/uaʔ/
◌ูย	/uːj/	◌ุย	/uj/
เ◌ว	/eːw/	เ◌็ว	/ew/
แ◌ว	/ɛːw/	–	–
เ◌ือ	/ɯa/	เ◌ือะ	/ɯaʔ/
เ◌ย	/ɤːj/	–	–
◌อย	/ɔːj/	–	–
โ◌ย	/oːj/	–	–

Additionally, there are three triphthongs. For purposes of determining tone, those marked with an asterisk are sometimes classified as long:

Thai script	IPA
เ◌ียว*	/iaw/
◌วย*	/uaj/
เ◌ือย*	/ɯaj/

=== Tones ===
The five phonemic tones of Standard Thai pronounced with the syllable '/naː/':

There are five phonemic tones: mid, low, falling, high, and rising, sometimes referred to in older reference works as rectus, gravis, circumflexus, altus, and demissus, respectively. The table shows an example of both the phonemic tones and their phonetic realization, in the IPA. Moren & Zsiga (2006) and Zsiga & Nitisaroj (2007) provide phonetic and phonological analyses of Thai tone realization.

Thai language tone chart

Notes:

1. Five-level tone value: Mid [33], Low [21], Falling [41], High [45], Rising [214]. Traditionally, the high tone was recorded as either [44] or [45]. This remains true for the older generation, but the high tone is changing to [334] among youngsters.
2. For the diachronic changes of tone value, see Pittayaporn (2007).
3. The full complement of tones exists only in so-called "live syllables", those that end in a long vowel or a sonorant (/m/, /n/, /ŋ/, /j/, /w/).
4. For "dead syllables", those that end in a plosive (/p/, /t/, /k/) or in a short vowel, only three tonal distinctions are possible: low, high, and falling. Because syllables analyzed as ending in a short vowel may have a final glottal stop (especially in slower speech), all "dead syllables" are phonetically checked, and have the reduced tonal inventory characteristic of checked syllables.

==== Open ('unchecked') syllables ====
Tone	Thai	Example	Phonemic	Phonetic	Gloss
Mid	สามัญ	คา	/kʰāː/	[kʰäː˧]	'stick'
Low	เอก	ข่า	/kʰàː/	[kʰäː˨˩] or [kʰäː˩]	'galangal'
Falling	โท	ค่า	/kʰâː/	[kʰäː˦˩]	'value'
High	ตรี	ค้า	/kʰáː/	[kʰäː˦˥] or [kʰäː˥]	'to trade'
Rising	จัตวา	ขา	/kʰǎː/	[kʰäː˨˩˦] or [kʰäː˨˦]	'leg'

==== Closed ('checked') syllables ====
Tone	Thai	Example	Phonemic	Phonetic	Gloss
Low (short vowel)	เอก	หมัก	/màk/	[mäk̚˨˩]	'marinate'
Low (long vowel)	เอก	หมาก	/màːk/	[mäːk̚˨˩]	'areca nut, areca palm, betel, fruit'
High	ตรี	มัก	/mák/	[mäk̚˦˥]	'habitually, likely to'
Falling	โท	มาก	/mâːk/	[mäːk̚˦˩]	'a lot, abundance, many'

In some English loanwords, closed syllables with a long vowel ending in an obstruent sound have a high tone, and closed syllables with a short vowel ending in an obstruent sound have a falling tone.

Tone	Thai	Example	Phonemic	Phonetic	Gloss
High	ตรี	มาร์ก	/máːk/	[mäːk̚˦˥]	'Marc, Mark'
High	ตรี	ชาร์จ	/tɕʰáːt/	[tɕʰäːt̚˦˥]	'charge'
Falling	โท	เมกอัป	/méːk.ʔâp/	[meːk̚˦˥.ʔäp̚˦˩]	'make-up'
Falling	โท	แร็กเกต	/rɛ́k.kêt/	[rɛk̚˦˥.ket̚˦˩]	'racket'

== Grammar ==
From the perspective of linguistic typology, Thai can be considered an analytic language. The word order is subject–verb–object, although the subject is often omitted. Additionally, Thai is an isolating language lacking any form of inflectional morphology whatsoever. Thai pronouns are selected according to the gender and relative status of speaker and audience.

=== Adjectives and adverbs ===
There is no morphological distinction between adverbs and adjectives. Many words can be used in either function. They follow the word they modify, which may be a noun, verb, or another adjective or adverb.

คน อ้วน
khon uan
/kʰōn ʔûa̯n/
'a fat person'

คน ที่ อ้วน เร็ว
khon thi uan reo
/kʰōn tʰîː ʔûa̯n rēw/
'a person who becomes fat quickly'

Comparatives take the form "A X กว่า B" (kwa, /kwàː/), 'A is more X than B'. The superlative is expressed as "A X ที่สุด" (thi sut, /tʰîː sùt/), 'A is most X'.

เขา อ้วน กว่า ฉัน
khao uan kwa chan
/kʰǎw ʔûa̯n kwàː tɕʰǎn/
'S/he is fatter than me.'

เขา อ้วน ที่สุด
khao uan {thi sut}
/kʰǎw ʔûa̯n tʰîː sùt/
'S/he is the fattest (of all).'

Adjectives in Thai can be used as complete predicates. Because of this, many words used to indicate tense in verbs (see Verbs:Tense below) may be used to describe adjectives.

ฉัน หิว
chan hio
/tɕʰǎn hǐw/
'I am hungry.'

ฉัน จะ หิว
chan cha hio
/tɕʰǎn tɕàʔ hǐw/
'I will be hungry.'

ฉัน กำลัง หิว
chan kamlang hio
/tɕʰǎn kām.lāŋ hǐw/
'I am hungry right now.'

ฉัน หิว แล้ว
chan hio laeo
/tɕʰǎn hǐw lɛ́ːw/
'I am already hungry.'

- Remark ฉันหิวแล้ว mostly means 'I am hungry right now' because normally, แล้ว (/lɛ́ːw/) marks the change of a state, but แล้ว has many other uses as well. For example, in the sentence, แล้วเธอจะไปไหน (/lɛ́ːw tʰɤ̄ː tɕàʔ pāj nǎj/): 'So where are you going?', แล้ว (/lɛ́ːw/) is used as a discourse particle.

=== Verbs ===
Verbs do not inflect. They do not change with person, tense, voice, mood, or number; nor are there any participles. The language being analytic and case-less, the relationship between subject, direct and indirect object is conveyed through word order and auxiliary verbs. Transitive verbs follow the pattern subject-verb-object.

ฉัน ตี เขา
chan ti khao
/tɕʰǎn tīː kʰǎw/
1SG hit 3SG
'I hit him.'

เขา ตี ฉัน
khao ti chan
/kʰǎw tīː tɕʰǎn/
3SG hit 1SG
'They hit me.'

In order to convey tense, aspect and mood (TAM), the Thai verbal system employs auxiliaries and verb serialization. TAM markers are however not obligatory and often left out in colloquial use. In such cases, the precise meaning is determined through context. This results in sentences lacking both TAM markers and overt context being ambiguous and subject to various interpretations.

ฉัน กิน ที่ นั่น
chan kin thi nan
/tɕʰǎn kīn tʰîː nân/
'I eat there.'

ฉัน กิน ที่ นั่น เมื่อวาน
chan kin thi nan mueawan
/tɕʰǎn kīn tʰîː nân mɯ̂a̯.wāːn/
'I ate there yesterday.'

ฉัน จะ กิน ที่ นั่น พรุ่งนี้
chan cha kin thi nan phrungni
/tɕʰǎn tɕàʔ kīn thîː nân pʰrûŋ.níː/
'I'll eat there tomorrow.'

The sentence chan kin thi nan can thus be interpreted as 'I am eating there', 'I eat there habitually', 'I will eat there' or 'I ate there'. Aspect markers in Thai have been divided into four distinct groups based on their usage. These markers could appear either before or after the verb. The following list describes some of the most commonly used aspect markers. A number of these aspect markers are also full verbs on their own and carry a distinct meaning. For example yu (อยู่) as a full verb means 'to stay, to live or to remain at'. However, as an auxiliary it can be described as a temporary aspect or continuative marker.

- Imperfective
  - อยู่ yu /jùː/
  - ไป pai /pāj/
  - ยัง yang /jāŋ/
  - กำลัง kamlang /kām.lāŋ/
  - เคย khoey /kʰɤ̄ːj/
- Perfective
  - ได้ dai /dâːj/
- Perfect
  - แล้ว laeo /lɛ́ːw/
  - มา ma /māː/
- Prospective/Future
  - จะ cha /tɕàʔ/

The imperfective aspect marker กำลัง (kamlang, /kām lāŋ/, currently) is used before the verb to denote an ongoing action (similar to the -ing suffix in English). Kamlang is commonly interpreted as a progressive aspect marker. Similarly, อยู่ (yu, /jùː/) is a post-verbal aspect marker which corresponds to the continuative or temporary aspect.

เขา กำลัง วิ่ง
khao kamlang wing
/kʰǎw kām.lāŋ wîŋ/

เขา วิ่ง อยู่
khao wing yu
/kʰǎw wîŋ jùː/

เขา กำลัง วิ่ง อยู่
khao kamlang wing yu
/kʰǎw kām.lāŋ wîŋ jùː/
'He is running.'

Comparably, ยัง (yang, /jāŋ/, still) is used in an incomplete action, and usually collocates with yu (อยู่) or any second marker in common use.

เขา ยัง เขียน อยู่
khao yang khian yu
/kʰǎw jāŋ kʰǐa̯n jùː/
He is still writing.

The marker ได้ (dai, /dâːj/) is usually analyzed as a past tense marker when it occurs before the verb. As a full verb, dai means 'to get or receive'. However, when used after a verb, dai takes on a meaning of potentiality or successful outcome of the main verb.

เขา ได้ ไป เที่ยว เมือง ลาว
khao dai pai thiao mueang lao
/kʰǎw dâːj pāj tʰîa̯w mɯ̄aŋ lāːw/
He visited Laos. (Past/Perfective)

เขา ตี ได้
khao ti dai
/kʰǎw tīː dâːj/
3SG hit POT
'He is/was allowed to hit' or 'He is/was able to hit.' (Potentiality)

แล้ว (laeo, /lɛ́ːw/; 'already') is treated as a marker indicating the perfect aspect. That is to say, laeo marks the event as being completed at the time of reference. Laeo has two other meanings in addition to its use as a TAM marker. Laeo can either be a conjunction for sequential actions or an archaic word for 'to finish'.

เขา ได้ กิน
khao dai kin
/kʰǎw dâːj kīn/
3SG PST eat
He ate.

เขา กิน แล้ว
khao kin laeo
/kʰǎw kīn lɛ́ːw/
3SG eat PRF
He has eaten.

เขา ได้ กิน แล้ว
khao dai kin laeo
/kʰǎw dâːj kīn lɛ́ːw/
3SG PST eat PRF
He's already eaten.

Future can be indicated by จะ (cha, /tɕàʔ/; 'will') before the verb or by a time expression indicating the future. For example:

เขา จะ วิ่ง
khao cha wing
/kʰǎw tɕàʔ wîŋ/
3SG FUT run
'He will run' or 'He is going to run.'

Dative marker ให้ (hai, /hâj/; 'give') often used in a sentence to indicate prepositional or double objects.

เขา อ่าน หนังสือ ให้
khao an {nangsue} hai
/kʰǎw ʔàːn nǎŋ.sɯ̌ː hâj/
3SG read book DAT
'He reads book for (us).'

เขา ให้ อ่าน หนังสือ
khao hai an {nangsue}
/kʰǎw hâj ʔàːn nǎŋ.sɯ̌ː/
3SG DAT read book
'He obligates (us) to read book.'

เขา ให้ หนังสือ นักเรียน
khao hai {nangsue} {nak rian}
/kʰǎw hâj nǎŋ.sɯ̌ː nák ria̯n/
3SG DAT book student
'He gives book to student.'

The passive voice is indicated by the insertion of ถูก (thuk, /tʰùːk/) before the verb. For example:

เขา ถูก ตี
khao thuk ti
/kʰǎw tʰùːk tīː/
3SG PASS hit
'He got hit.'

The ถูก construction is traditionally an adversative passive, a feature common to many Southeast Asian languages where a passive construction is restricted to unfavorable meanings (e.g. "he was killed" but not "he was rewarded"), but in current usage is found with virtually all transitive verbs. This neutral usage first arose as an Anglicism as Thailand became Westernized in the early 20th century, but has since become pervasive. The adversative passive persists in the similar construction with โดน (don, /dōːn/).

Negation is indicated by placing ไม่ (mai, /mâj/; not) before the verb.

- เขาไม่ตี, (khao mai ti) 'He is not hitting' or 'He doesn't hit'.

Thai exhibits serial verb constructions, where verbs are strung together. Some word combinations are common and may be considered set phrases.

เขา ไป กิน ข้าว
khao pai kin khao
/kʰǎw pāj kīn kʰâːw/
he go eat rice
'He went out to eat'

ฉัน ฟัง ไม่ เข้าใจ
chan fang mai {khao chai}
/tɕʰǎn fāŋ mâj kʰâw tɕāj/
I listen not understand
'I don't understand what was said'

เข้า มา
khao ma
/kʰâw māː/
enter come
'Come in'

ออก ไป!
ok pai
/ʔɔ̀ːk pāj/
exit go
'Leave!' or 'Get out!'

=== Nouns ===
Nouns are uninflected and have no gender; there are no articles. Thai nouns are bare nouns and can be interpreted as singular, plural, definite or indefinite. Some specific nouns are reduplicated to form collectives: เด็ก (dek, 'child') is often repeated as เด็ก ๆ (dek dek) to refer to a group of children. The word พวก (phuak, /pʰûa̯k/) may be used as a prefix of a noun or pronoun as a collective to pluralize or emphasise the following word. (พวกผม, phuak phom, /pʰûa̯k pʰǒm/, 'we', masculine; พวกเรา phuak rao, /pʰûa̯k rāw/, emphasised 'we'; พวกหมา phuak ma, '(the) dogs'). Plurals are expressed by adding classifiers, used as measure words (ลักษณนาม), in the form of noun-number-classifier:

ครู ห้า คน
khru ha khon
/kʰrūː hâː kʰōn/
teacher five person
"five teachers"

While in English, such classifiers are usually absent ("four chairs") or optional ("two bottles of beer" or "two beers"), a classifier is almost always used in Thai (hence "chair four item" and "beer two bottle").

Possession in Thai is indicated by adding the word ของ (khong) in front of the noun or pronoun, but it may often be omitted. For example:

ลูก ของ แม่
luk khong mae
/lûːk kʰɔ̌ːŋ mɛ̂ː/
child {belonging to} mother
"mother's child"

นา อา
na a
/nāː ʔāː/
field uncle
"uncle's field"

==== Nominal phrases ====
Nominal phrases in Thai often use a special class of words classifiers. As previously mentioned, these classifiers are obligatory for noun phrases containing numerals e.g.

ผู้หญิง สอง คน
phuying song khon
/pʰûː.jǐŋ sɔ̌ːŋ kʰōn/
woman two CL
two women

Unlike any numeral, หนึ่ง ('one') can mark on both positions of classifier, but in different functions. The post-head one potentially marks a referent as indefinite article.

แก้ว หนึ่ง ใบ
kaew neung bai
/kɛ̂ːw nɯ̀ŋ bāj/
glass one CL
"one glass" (quantificational)

แก้ว ใบ หนึ่ง
kaew bai neung
/kɛ̂ːw bāj nɯ̀ŋ/
glass CL one
"a glass" (referential)

In the previous example khon (คน) acts as the classifier in the nominal phrase. This follows the form of noun-cardinal-classifier mentioned above. Classifiers are also required to form quantified noun phrases in Thai with some quantifiers such as ทุก ('all'), บาง ('some'). The examples below are demonstrated using the classifier khon, which is used for people.

{นักเรียน} ทุก คน
{nak rian} thuk khon
/nák rīa̯n tʰúk kʰōn/
student every CL
"every student"

ครู บาง คน
khru bang khon
/kʰrūː bāːŋ kʰōn/
teacher some CL
"some teacher"

However, classifiers are not utilized for negative quantification. Negative quantification is expressed by the pattern ไม่มี (mai mi, /mâj mīː/) + NOUN.

=== Demonstratives ===
Thai has a three-way distinction for its demonstratives: proximal นี่ (ni, /nîː/; 'this/these'), medial นั่น (nan, /nân/; 'that/those'), and distal โน่น (non, /nôːn/; 'that/those over there') which is rarely used. The tone is changed depending on usage: as a pronoun, the proximal demonstrative is นี่ (ni, /nîː/); while นี้ (ni, /níː) is a modifier placed after nouns, prepositions, classifiers, etc. For example:

นี่ คือ โต๊ะ ใหม่
ni kheu to mai
/nîː kʰɯ̄ː tóʔ màj/
this-PRO be table new
"this is a new table"

วาง ถ้วย บน นั้น
wang thuai bon nan
/wāːŋ tʰûa̯j bōn nán/
{put down} bowl on that-PREP
"put a bowl on there"

The word ไหน (nai, /nǎj/) plays the role of an interrogative determiner or pronoun.

แมว ตัว ไหน
maew tua nai
/mɛ̄ːw tūa̯ nǎj/
cat CL INT
"which cat?"

จอด ที่ ไหน
joat thi nai
/t͡ɕɔ̀ːt tʰîː nǎj/
park PREP INT
"where to park?"

พัก ตอน ไหน
phak toan nai
/pʰák tɔ̄ːn nǎj/
rest since INT
"when to rest?"

The syntax for demonstrative phrases, however, differ from that of cardinals and follow the pattern noun-classifier-demonstrative. For example, the noun phrase "this dog" would be expressed in Thai as หมาตัวนี้ (literally 'dog (classifier) this').

=== Pronouns ===
Subject pronouns are often omitted, with nicknames used where English would use a pronoun. See Thai name#Nicknames for more details. Pronouns, when used, are ranked in honorific registers, and may also make a T–V distinction in relation to kinship and social status. Specialised pronouns are used for royalty, and for Buddhist monks. The following are appropriate for conversational use:

Word	RTGS	IPA	Meaning
ข้าพเจ้า	khaphachao	/kʰâː.pʰáʔ.tɕâːw/	I/me (very formal)
กระผม	kraphom	/kràʔ.pʰǒm/	I/me (masculine; formal)
ผม	phom	/pʰǒm/	I/me (masculine; common)
ดิฉัน	dichan	/dìʔ.tɕʰǎn/	I/me (feminine; formal)
ฉัน	chan	/tɕʰǎn/	I/me (mainly used by women; common) Commonly pronounced as [tɕʰán]
ข้า	kha	/kʰâː/	I/me (from high-status to low-status or familiar; informal)
กู	ku	/kūː/	I/me (impolite/vulgar)
หนู	nu	/nǔː/	I/me (used by women when speaking to people much older than themselves; informal)
เรา	rao	/rāw/	we/us (common), I/me (casual), you (sometimes used but only when older person speaks to younger person)
คุณ	khun	/kʰūn/	you (common)
ท่าน	than	/tʰâːn/	you (highly honorific; formal) Commonly pronounced as [tʰân]
แก	kae	/kɛ̄ː/	you (familiar; informal)
เอ็ง	eng	/ʔēŋ/	you (from high-status to low-status or familiar; informal)
เธอ	thoe	/tʰɤ̄ː/	you (informal), she/her (informal)
มึง	mueng	/mɯ̄ŋ/	you (impolite/vulgar)
พี่	phi	/pʰîː/	older brother, sister (also used for older acquaintances; common)
น้อง	nong	/nɔ́ːŋ/	younger brother, sister (also used for younger acquaintances; common)
เขา	khao	/kʰǎw/	he/him (common), she/her (common) Commonly pronounced as [kʰáw]
มัน	man	/mān/	it, he/she (offensive if used to refer to a person)

The reflexive pronoun is ตัวเอง (tua eng), which can mean any of: myself, yourself, ourselves, himself, herself, themselves. This can be mixed with another pronoun to create an intensive pronoun, such as ตัวผมเอง (tua phom eng, lit: I myself) or ตัวคุณเอง (tua khun eng, lit: you yourself). Thai also does not have a separate possessive pronoun. Instead, possession is indicated by the particle ของ (khong). For example, "my mother" is แม่ของผม (mae khong phom, lit: mother of I). This particle is often implicit, so the phrase is shortened to แม่ผม (mae phom). Plural pronouns can be easily constructed by adding the word พวก (phuak) in front of a singular pronoun as in พวกเขา (phuak khao) meaning 'they' or พวกเธอ (phuak thoe) meaning the plural sense of 'you'. The only exception to this is เรา (rao), which can be used as singular (informal) or plural, but can also be used in the form of พวกเรา (phuak rao), which is only plural.

Thai has many more pronouns than those listed above. Their usage is full of nuances. For example:

- "ผม เรา ฉัน ดิฉัน หนู กู ข้า กระผม ข้าพเจ้า กระหม่อม อาตมา กัน ข้าน้อย ข้าพระพุทธเจ้า อั๊ว เขา" all translate to "I", but each expresses a different gender, age, politeness, status, or relationship between speaker and listener.
- เรา (rao) can be first person (I), second person (you), or both (we), depending on the context.
- Children or younger women could use or be referred by word หนู (nu) when talking with an older person. The word หนู could be both feminine first person (I) and feminine second person (you) and also neuter first and neuter second person for children.
  - หนู commonly means rat or mouse, though it also refers to small creatures in general.
- The second person pronoun เธอ (thoe) (lit: you) is semi-feminine. It is used only when the speaker or the listener (or both) are female. Males usually do not address each other by this pronoun.
- Both คุณ (khun) and เธอ (thoe) are polite neuter second person pronouns. However, คุณเธอ (khun thoe) is a feminine derogative third person.
- Instead of a second person pronoun such as คุณ ('you'), it is much more common for unrelated strangers to call each other พี่ น้อง ลุง ป้า น้า อา ตา or ยาย (brother, sister, aunt, uncle, granny).
- To express deference, the second person pronoun is sometimes replaced by a profession, similar to how, in English, presiding judges are always addressed as "your honor" rather than "you". In Thai, students always address their teachers by ครู, คุณครู or อาจารย์ (each meaning 'teacher') rather than คุณ ('you'). Teachers, monks, and doctors are almost always addressed this way.

=== Particles ===
The particles are often untranslatable words added to the end of a sentence to indicate respect, a request, encouragement or other moods (similar to the use of intonation in English), as well as varying the level of formality. They are not used in elegant (written) Thai. The most common particles indicating respect are ครับ (khrap, /kʰráp/, with a high tone) when the speaker is a man, and ค่ะ (kha, /kʰâʔ/, with a falling tone) when the speaker is a woman. Used in a question or a request, the particle ค่ะ (falling tone) is changed to a คะ (high tone).

Other common particles are:

Word	RTGS	IPA	Meaning
จ้ะ, จ้า or จ๋า	cha	/tɕâʔ/, /tɕâː/ or /tɕǎː/	indicating emphasis. Used in a less formal context when speaking to friends or someone younger than yourself
ละ or ล่ะ	la	/láʔ/ or /lâʔ/	indicating emphasis.
สิ or ซิ	si	/sìʔ/ or /síʔ/	indicating emphasis or an imperative. It can come across as ordering someone to do something
นะ or น่ะ	na	/náʔ/ or /nâʔ/	softening; indicating a request or making your sentence sound more friendly.

== Register ==
Central Thai is composed of several distinct registers, forms for different social contexts:

- Street or Common Thai (ภาษาพูด, phasa phut, spoken Thai): informal, without polite terms of address, as used between close relatives and friends.
- Elegant or Formal Thai (ภาษาเขียน, phasa khian, written Thai): official and written version, includes respectful terms of address; used in simplified form in newspapers.
- Rhetorical Thai: used for public speaking.
- Religious Thai: (heavily influenced by Sanskrit and Pāli) used when discussing Buddhism or addressing monks.
- Royal Thai (ราชาศัพท์, racha sap): influenced by Khmer, this is used when addressing members of the royal family or describing their activities. (See Monarchy of Thailand § Rachasap.)

Most Thais can speak and understand all of these contexts. Street and Elegant Thai are the basis of all conversations. Rhetorical, religious, and royal Thai are taught in schools as part of the national curriculum.

As noted above, Thai has several registers, each having certain usages, such as colloquial, formal, literary, and poetic. Thus, the word 'eat' can be กิน (kin; common), แดก (daek; vulgar), ยัด (yat; vulgar), บริโภค (boriphok; formal), รับประทาน (rapprathan; formal), ฉัน (chan; religious), or เสวย (sawoei; royal), as illustrated below:

"to eat"	IPA	Transliteration	Usage	Note
กิน	/kīn/	kin	common	
แดก	/dɛ̀ːk/	daek	vulgar	
ยัด	/ját/	yat	vulgar	Original meaning is 'to cram'
บริโภค	/bɔ̄ː.ríʔ.pʰôːk/	boriphok	formal, literary	
รับประทาน	/ráp.pràʔ.tʰāːn/	rapprathan	formal, polite	Often shortened to ทาน /tʰāːn/.
ฉัน	/tɕʰǎn/	chan	religious	
เสวย	/sàʔ.wɤ̌ːj/	sawoei	royal	

Thailand also uses the distinctive Thai six-hour clock in addition to the 24-hour clock.

== Vocabulary ==
Other than compound words and words of foreign origin, most words are monosyllabic.

Chinese-language influence was strong until the 13th century when the use of Chinese characters was abandoned, and replaced by Sanskrit and Pali scripts. However, the vocabulary of Thai retains many words borrowed from Middle Chinese.

Khmer was used as a prestige language in the early days of the Thai kingdoms which are believed to have been bilingual societies proficient in Thai and Khmer. There are over 2,500 Thai words derived from Khmer and half of the vocabulary are of Pali and Sanskrit origin that Thai borrowed via Khmer, surpassing the number of Tai cognates. These Khmer words span across all semantic fields. Thai scholar Uraisi Varasarin classified them into over 200 sub-categories. As a result, it is impossible for Thais, past and present, to engage in a conversation without incorporating Khmer loanwords in any given topic. The influence is particularly preponderant in regard to royal court terminology.

Later, most vocabulary was borrowed from Sanskrit and Pali; Buddhist terminology is particularly indebted to these. Indic words have a more formal register, and may be compared to Latin and French borrowings in English. Since the beginning of the 20th century, however, the English language has had the greatest influence, especially for scientific, technical, international, and other modern terms.

Origin	Example	IPA	Gloss
Native Tai	ไฟ	/fāj/	fire
Native Tai	น้ำ	/náːm/	water
Native Tai	เมือง	/mɯ̄aŋ/	town
Native Tai	รุ่งเรือง	/rûŋ rɯ̄aŋ/	prosperous
Indic sources: Pāli or Sanskrit	อัคนี (agni)	/ʔàk.kʰáʔ.nīː/	fire
Indic sources: Pāli or Sanskrit	ชล (jala)	/tɕʰōn/	water
Indic sources: Pāli or Sanskrit	ธานี (dhānī)	/tʰāː.nīː/	town
Indic sources: Pāli or Sanskrit	วิโรจน์ (virocana)	/wíʔ.rôːt/	prosperous

=== Arabic-origin ===
Arabic words	Thai rendition	IPA	Gloss
الْقُرْآن (al-qurʾān) or قُرْآن (qurʾān)	อัลกุรอาน or โกหร่าน	/ʔān kùʔ.ráʔ.ʔāːn/ or /kōː.ràːn/	Quran
رجم (rajm)	ระยำ	/ráʔ.jām/	bad, vile (vulgar)

=== Chinese-origin ===
From Middle Chinese or Teochew Chinese.

Chinese words		Thai rendition	IPA	Gloss
交椅	Teochew: gao^{1} in^{2}	เก้าอี้	/kâw.ʔîː/	chair
粿條 / 粿条	Min Nan: kóe-tiâu	ก๋วยเตี๋ยว	/kǔaj.tǐaw/	rice noodle
姐	Hokkien: chiá/ché Teochew: zê^{2}/zia^{2}	เจ้ or เจ๊	/tɕêː/ or /tɕéː/	older sister (used in Chinese community in Thailand)
二	Hokkien: jī Teochew: ri^{6}	ยี่	/jîː/	two (archaic, but still used in word ยี่สิบ /jîː sìp/; 'twenty')
豆	Middle Chinese: dəu^{H}	ถั่ว	/tʰùa/	bean
盎	Middle Chinese: ʔɑŋ^{X}/ʔɑŋ^{H}	อ่าง	/ʔàːŋ/	basin
膠	Middle Chinese: kˠau	กาว	/kāːw/	glue
鯁	Middle Chinese: kˠæŋ^{X}	ก้าง	/kâːŋ/	fishbone
坎	Middle Chinese: kʰʌm^{X}	ขุม	/kʰǔm/	pit
塗	Middle Chinese: duo/ɖˠa	ทา	/tʰāː/	to smear
退	Middle Chinese: tʰuʌi^{H}	ถอย	/tʰɔ̌j/	to step back

=== English-origin ===
English words	Thai rendition	IPA	Remark
apple	แอปเปิล	/ʔɛ́p.pɤ̂n/	
bank	แบงก์	/bɛ́ŋ/	means 'bank' or 'banknote'
bill	บิล	/bīn/ or /bīw/	
cake	เค้ก	/kʰéːk/	
captain	กัปตัน	/kàp.tān/	
cartoon	การ์ตูน	/kāː.tūːn/	
clinic	คลินิก	/kʰlíʔ.nìk/	
computer	คอมพิวเตอร์	/kʰɔ̄m.pʰíw.tɤ̂ː/	colloquially shortened to คอม /kʰɔ̄m/
corruption	คอร์รัปชัน	/kʰɔ̄ː.ráp.tɕʰân/	
countdown	เคานต์ดาวน์	/kʰáw.dāːw/	
dinosaur	ไดโนเสาร์	/dāj.nōː.sǎw/	
duel	ดวล	/dūan/	
e-mail	อีเมล	/ʔīː mēːw/	
fashion	แฟชั่น	/fɛ̄ː.tɕʰân/	
golf	กอล์ฟ	/kɔ́p/	
shampoo	แชมพู	/tɕʰɛ̄m.pʰūː/	
slip	สลิป	/sàʔ.líp/	
taxi	แท็กซี่	/tʰɛ́k.sîː/	
technology	เทคโนโลยี	/tʰék.nōː.lōː.jīː, -jîː/	
valve	วาล์ว	/wāːw/	
visa	วีซ่า	/wīː.sâː/	
wreath	(พวง)หรีด	/rìːt/	

=== French-origin ===
French words	Thai rendition	IPA	English translation
buffet	บุฟเฟต์	/búp.fêː/	
café	กาแฟ	/kāː.fɛ̄ː/	coffee
café	คาเฟ่	/kʰāː.fêː/	coffee shop, restaurant serving alcoholic drinks and providing entertainment (dated)
caféine	กาเฟอีน	/kāː.fēː.ʔīːn/	caffeine
chauffeur	โชเฟอร์	/tɕʰōː.fɤ̂ː/	
consul	กงสุล	/kōŋ.sǔn/	
coupon	คูปอง	/kʰūː.pɔ̄ŋ/	
croissant	ครัวซ็อง	/kʰrūa.sɔ̄ŋ/	
gramme	กรัม	/krām/	
litre	ลิตร	/lít/	
mètre	เมตร	/méːt/	metre
parquet	ปาร์เกต์	/pāː.kêː/	
pétanque	เปตอง	/pēː.tɔ̄ːŋ/	

=== Japanese-origin ===
Japanese words	Thai rendition	IPA	Gloss
カラオケ ([kaɾaoke])	คาราโอเกะ	/kʰāː.rāː.ʔōː.kèʔ/	karaoke
忍者 ([ɲiꜜɲd͡ʑa])	นินจา	/nīn.tɕāː/	ninja
寿司 ([sɯɕiꜜ])	ซูชิ	/sūː.tɕʰíʔ/	sushi

=== Khmer-origin ===
Probably from Old Khmer.

Khmer words	Thai rendition	IPA	Gloss
ក្រុង (/kroŋ/)	กรุง	/krūŋ/	capital city
ខ្ទើយ (/kʰtəːj/)	กะเทย	/kàʔ.tʰɤ̄ːj/	kathoey
ខ្មួយ (/kʰmuəj/)	ขโมย	/kʰàʔ.mōːj/	to steal, thief
ច្រមុះ (/crɑː.moh/)	จมูก	/tɕàʔ.mùːk/	nose
ច្រើន (/craən/)	เจริญ	/tɕàʔ.rɤ̄ːn/	prosperous
ឆ្លាត or ឆ្លាស (/cʰlaːt/ or /cʰlaːh/)	ฉลาด	/tɕʰàʔ.làːt/	smart
ថ្នល់ (/tʰnɑl/)	ถนน	/tʰàʔ.nǒn/	road
ភ្លើង (/pʰləːŋ/)	เพลิง	/pʰlɤ̄ːŋ/	fire
ទន្លេ (/tɔn.leː/)	ทะเล	/tʰáʔ.lēː/	sea

=== Malay-origin ===
Malay words	Thai rendition	IPA	Gloss
kelasi	กะลาสี	/kàʔ.lāː.sǐː/	sailor, seaman
sagu	สาคู	/sǎː.kʰūː/	sago
surau	สุเหร่า	/sùʔ.ràw/	small mosque

=== Persian-origin ===
Persian words	Thai rendition	IPA	Gloss
گلاب (golâb)	กุหลาบ	/kùʔ.làːp/	rose
کمربند (kamarband)	ขาวม้า	/kʰǎːw máː/	loincloth
ترازو (tarâzu)	ตราชู	/trāː tɕʰūː/	balance scale
سقرلات (saqerlât)	สักหลาด	/sàk.kàʔ.làːt/	felt
آلت (âlat)	อะไหล่	/ʔàʔ.làj/	spare part

=== Portuguese-origin ===
The Portuguese were the first Western nation to arrive in what is modern-day Thailand in the 16th century during the Ayutthaya period. Their influence in trade, especially weaponry, allowed them to establish a community just outside the capital and practise their faith, as well as exposing and converting the locals to Christianity. Thus, Portuguese words involving trade and religion were introduced and used by the locals.

Portuguese words	Thai rendition	IPA	Gloss
carta / cartaz	กระดาษ	/kràʔ.dàːt/	paper
garça	(นก)กระสา	/kràʔ.sǎː/	heron
leilão	เลหลัง	/lēː.lǎŋ/	auction, low-priced
padre	บาท(หลวง)	/bàːt.lǔaŋ/	(Christian) priest
pão	(ขนม)ปัง	/pāŋ/	bread
real	เหรียญ	/rǐan/	coin
sabão	สบู่	/sàʔ.bùː/	soap

=== Tamil-origin ===
Tamil words	Thai rendition	IPA	Gloss
கறி (kaṟi)	กะหรี่	/kàʔ.rìː/	curry, curry powder
கிராம்பு (kirāmpu)	กานพลู	/kāːn.pʰlūː/	clove
நெய் (ney)	เนย	/nɤ̄ːj/	butter

== Writing system ==
"Kingdom of Thailand" in Thai script.

Thai is written in the Thai script, an abugida written from left to right. The language and its script are closely related to the Lao language and script. Most literate Lao are able to read and understand Thai, as more than half of the Thai vocabulary, grammar, intonation, vowels and so forth are common with the Lao language.

The Thais adopted and modified the Khmer script to create their own writing system. While in Thai the pronunciation can largely be inferred from the script, the orthography is complex, with silent letters to preserve original spellings and many letters representing the same sound. While the oldest known inscription in the Khmer language dates from 611 CE, inscriptions in Thai writing began to appear around 1292 CE. Notable features include:

1. It is an abugida script, in which the implicit vowel is a short /a/ in a syllable without final consonant and a short /o/ in a syllable with final consonant.
2. Tone markers, if present, are placed above the final onset consonant of the syllable.
3. Vowels sounding after an initial consonant can be located before, after, above or below the consonant, or in a combination of these positions.

=== Transcription ===
There is no universally applied method for transcribing Thai into the Latin alphabet. For example, the name of the main airport is transcribed variably as Suvarnabhumi, Suwannaphum, or Suwunnapoom. Guide books, textbooks and dictionaries follow different systems. For this reason, many language courses recommend that learners master the Thai script.

Official standards are the Royal Thai General System of Transcription (RTGS), published by the Royal Institute of Thailand, and the almost identical ISO 11940-2 defined by the International Organization for Standardization. The RTGS system is increasingly used in Thailand by central and local governments, especially for road signs. Its main drawback is that it does not indicate tone or vowel length. As the system is based on pronunciation, not orthography, reconstruction of Thai spelling from RTGS romanisation is not possible.

=== Transliteration ===
The ISO published an international standard for the transliteration of Thai into Roman script in September 2005 (ISO 11940). By adding diacritics to the Latin letters it makes the transcription reversible, making it a true transliteration. Notably, this system is used by Google Translate, although it does not seem to appear in many other contexts, such as textbooks and other instructional media.

== Sample text ==
Article 1 of the Universal Declaration of Human Rights in Thai:

Thai language in Thai Script
มนุษย์ทั้งหลายเกิดมามีอิสระและเสมอภาคกันในเกียรติศักด[เกียรติศักดิ์]และสิทธิ ต่างมีเหตุผลและมโนธรรม และควรปฏิบัติต่อกันด้วยเจตนารมณ์แห่งภราดรภาพ

Transliteration (RTGS)

manut thang-laai koet-ma mi itsara lae samoephak kan nai kiattisak lae sitthi. tang mi hetphon lae manotham, lae khuan patibat to kan duai chettanarom haeng pharadonphap.

Transliteration (Paiboon)

ma-nút táng-lǎai gɤ̀ɤt-maa mii ìt-sa-rà lɛ́ sa-mɤ̂ɤ-pâak gan nai gìat-dti-sàk lɛ́ sìt-tí. dtàang mii hèt-pǒn lɛ́ ma-noo-tam, lɛ́ kuan bpa-dti-bàt dtɔ̀ɔ gan dûai jèet-dta-naa-rom hɛ̀ng pa-raa-dɔɔn-pâap.
Transcription (IPA)
[ma˧.nut̚˦˥ tʰaŋ˦˥.laːː j˩˩˦ kɤː ːt̚˧.maː ˧ miː ˧ ʔit̚˨˩.sa˧.raʔ˨˩ lɛʔ˦˥ sa˧.mɤː ˩˩˦.pʰaː k̚˥˩ kan˧ naj˧ kia̯t̚˨˩.ti˧.sak̚˨˩ lɛʔ˦˥ sit̚˨˩.tʰiʔ˦˥ taː ŋ˨˩ miː ˧ heː t̚˨˩.pʰon˩˩˦ lɛʔ˦˥ ma˧.noː ˧.tʰam˧ lɛʔ˦˥ kʰua̯n˧ pa˧.ti˧.bat̚˨˩ tɔː ˨˩ kan˧ dua̯j˥˩ t͡ɕeː ːt̚˨˩.ta˧.naː ˧.rom˧ hɛŋ˨˩ pʰa˧.raː ˧.dɔː n˧.pʰaː p̚˥˩]

Article 1 of the Universal Declaration of Human Rights in English:

Translation
All human beings are born free and equal in dignity and rights. They are endowed with reason and conscience and should act towards one another in a spirit of brotherhood.

== See also ==
- Thai script
- Thai honorifics
- Thai literature
- Thai numerals
- Thai braille
- Thai typography
- Comparison of Lao and Thai
