= George Cœdès =

French historian (1886–1969)

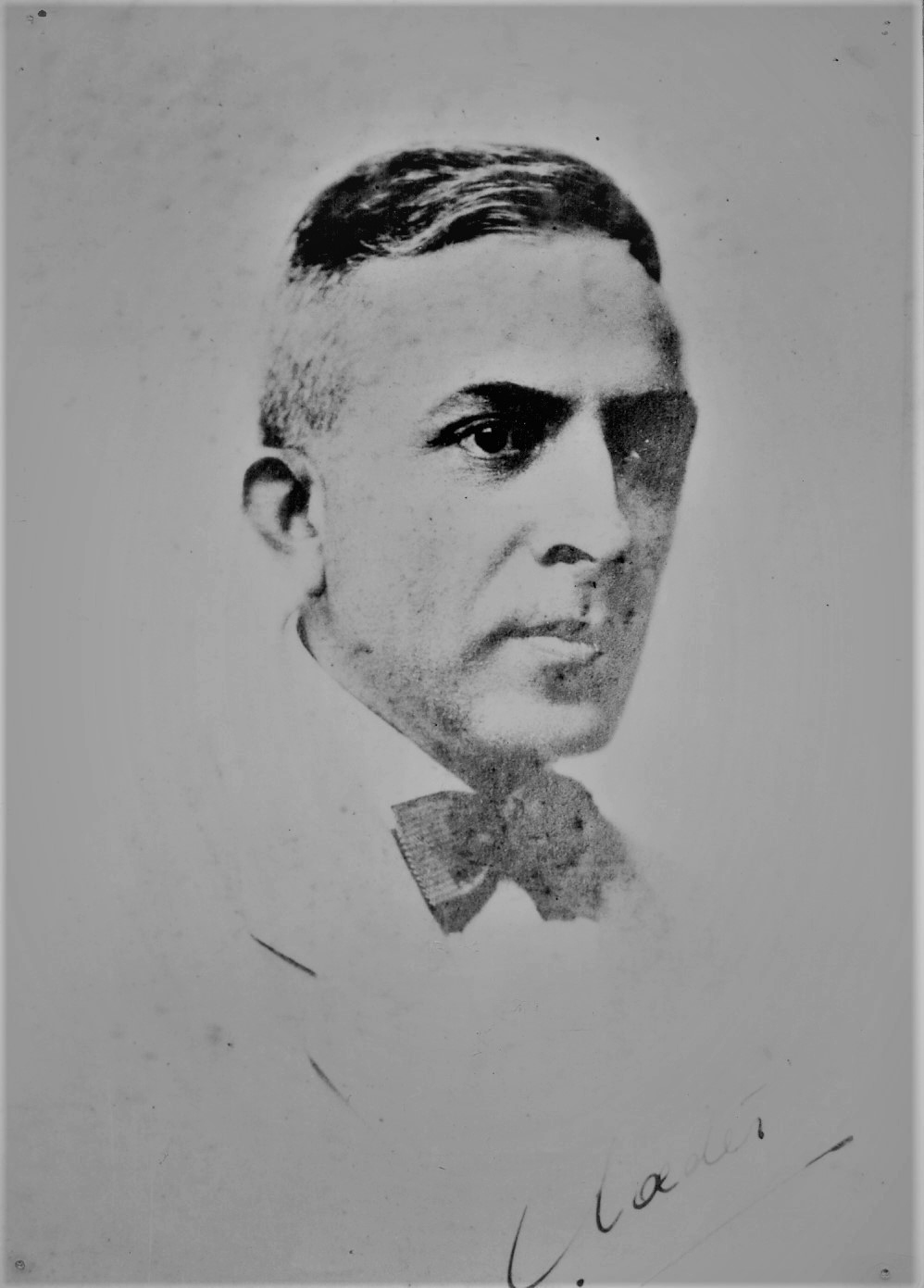
- George Cœdès, n.d.
- Born: August 10, 1886; Paris, France
- Died: October 2, 1969 (aged 83); Neuilly-sur-Seine, France
- Spouse: Neang Yap (m. 1935)

Academic background
- Education: École pratique des hautes études (1905)

Academic work
- Discipline: Historian, archeologist
- Sub-discipline: Indianized kingdoms of ancient Southeast Asia
- Institutions: National Library of Thailand (1918-1929); École française d'Extrême-Orient (1929-1946)
- Notable works: Cœdès transliteration of Thai

George Cœdès (French: [ʒɔʁʒ sedɛs]; 10 August 1886 – 2 October 1969) was a French scholar of Southeast Asian archaeology and history.

== Biography ==
Cœdès was born in Paris to a family known as having settled in the region of Strasbourg before 1740. His ancestors worked for the royal Treasury. His grandfather, Louis-Eugène Cœdès was a painter, pupil of Léon Coignet. His father Hippolyte worked as a banker. It has also, incorrectly, been asserted that he was descended from Hungarian-Jewish émigrés.

Cœdès became director of the National Library of Thailand in 1918, and in 1929 became director of L'École française d'Extrême-Orient (EFEO), where he remained until 1946. He was also an editor of the Journal of the Siam Society during the 1920s. In 1935, he married a Cambodian woman named Neang Yap.

After leaving EFEO in 1946, he lived in Paris until he died in 1969.

== Works ==
He wrote two texts in the field, The Indianized States of Southeast Asia (1968, 1975) (first published in 1948 as Les états hindouisés d'Indochine et d'Indonésie) and The Making of South East Asia (1966), as well as innumerable articles, in which he developed the concept of the Indianized kingdom. Perhaps his greatest lasting scholarly accomplishment was his work on Sanskrit and Old Khmer inscriptions from Cambodia. In addition to scores of articles (especially in the Bulletin of the École française d'Extrême-Orient), his 8-volume work Inscriptions du Cambodge (1937-1966) contains editions and translations of over a thousand inscriptions from pre-Angkorian and Angkor-era monuments, and stands as Cœdès' magnum opus. One stele, the recently rediscovered K-127, contains an inscription of what has been dubbed the "Khmer Zero", the first known use of zero in the modern number system. The transliteration system that he devised for Thai (and Khmer) is used by specialists of Thai and other writing systems derived from that of Khmer.

George Cœdès is credited with rediscovering the former kingdom of Srivijaya, centred on the modern-day Indonesian city of Palembang, but with influence extending from Sumatra through to the Malay Peninsula and Java.

However, due to focusing on the history of lower Southeast Asia, Cœdès was criticized by another historian, from Japan, Tatsuo Hoshino as having underestimated the importance of northern Indochina, Yunnan, and the central Mekong Valley.

== Published works ==
- Textes d'auteurs grecs et latins relatifs à l'Extrême-Orient depuis le IV^{e} siècle av. J.-C. jusqu'au XIV^{e} siècle, 1910
- Études cambodgiennes, 1911–1956
- Le Royaume de Çrīvijaya, 1918
- "Some Problems in the Ancient History of the Hinduized States of South-East Asia", Journal of Southeast Asian History, Vol.5, No.2, pp. 1–14
- "À propos de l'origine des chiffres arabes", Bulletin of the School of Oriental Studies, University of London, Vol.6, No.2, pp. 323–328
- "La Stèle de Ta-Prohm", Bulletin de l'École française d'Extrême-Orient (BEFEO), Hanoi, VI, 1906, pp. 44–81
- "The Origins of the Sukhodaya Dynasty", Journal of the Siam Society, Vol. 14.1, 1921
- Listes generales des inscriptions et des monuments du Champa et du Cambodge, Hanoi, Imprimerie d'Extrême-Orient, 1923
- The Vajiranana National Library of Siam, Bangkok, Council of the National Library, 1924
- Documents sur l'histoire politique et religieuse du Laos occidental, 1925
- "Une exposition de sculptures Khmères et Siamoises au Musée Cernuschi", Artibus Asiae, Vol.1, No.3 (1926), pp. 190–202
- "À propos de la chute du royaume de Çrīvijaya". Bijdragen tot de Taal-, Land- en Volkenkunde van Nederlandsch-Indië, Deel 83, 2de/3de Afl. (1927), pp. 459–472
- "The excavations at Pong Tuk and their importance for the ancient history of Siam", Journal of the Siam Society, Vol.21, part 3, Mar. 1928, pp. 195–209
- "Études cambodgiennes: XXXI. Nouvelles notes sur tcheou ta-kouan", Bulletin de l'École française d'Extrême-Orient (BEFEO), II, pp. 148–151
- "Les inscriptions malaises de Çrīvijaya". Bulletin de l'École Française d'Extrême-Orient, 30 (1930), pp. 29–80.
- "Pa-sseu-wei", T'oung Pao, Second Series, Vol. 30, No. 3/5 (1933), pp. 224–230
- Un grand roi du Cambodge: Jayavarman VII, Phnom Penh, Editions de la Bibliothèque Royale, 1935
- "L'origine du cycle des douze animaux au Cambodge", T'oung Pao, Second Series, Vol.31, Livr.3/5 (1935), pp. 315–329
- Inscriptions du Cambodge, Hanoi, Imp. d'Extreme-Orient, 1937–1966
- Pour mieux comprendre Angkor, 1943
- Les stèles de Sdok Kok Thom, Phnom Sandak et Prah Vihar, 1943–1946
- Histoire ancienne des États hindouisés d'Extrême-Orient, Hanoi, Imprimerie d'Extrême-Orient, 1944
- "Fouilles en Cochinchine: Le Site de Go Oc Eo, Ancien Port du Royaume de Fou-nan", Artibus Asiae, Vol.10, No.3 (1947), pp. 193–199
- Les états hindouisés d'Indochine et d'Indonésie, 1948
- "Un yantra recemment decouvert a Angkor", Journal asiatique, Année 1952, p. [465]–477.
- "Une Roue de la Loi avec inscription en Pāli provenant du Site de P'ră Păthŏm", Artibus Asiae, Vol.19, No.3/4 (1956), pp. 221–226
- "The Traibhūmikathā Buddhist Cosmology and Treaty on Ethics", East and West, Vol.7, No.4 (January 1957), pp. 349–352
- "Note sur une stele indienne d'epoque Pāla découverte a Ayudhyā (Siam)", Artibus Asiae, Vol.22, No.1/2 (1959), pp. 9–14
- "Les Môns de Dvāravatī", Artibus Asiae. Supplementum, Vol.23, pp. 112–116
- Les Peuples de la péninsule indochinoise, 1962
- Découverte numismatique au Siam interessant le royaume de Dvaravati, Paris, Librairie C. Klincksieck, 1964.
- L'avenir des études khmères, Saigon, Imprimerie nouvelle d'Extrême-Orient, 1965
- Angkor: an Introduction translated and edited by Emily Floyd Gardiner, photographs by George Bliss, Hong Kong, Oxford University Press, 1966
- The making of South East Asia, translated by H. M. Wright, London, Routledge & Kegan Paul, 1966
- Catalogue des manuscrits en pali, laotien et siamois provenant de la Thailande, Copenhague, Bibliothèque Royale, 1966
- The Indianized States of Southeast Asia, edited by Walter F. Vella, translated by Susan Brown Cowing, Canberra, Australian National University Press, 1968
- —and Charles Archaimbault, Les trois mondes = Traibhumi Brah R'van Paris, École française d'Extrême-Orient 1973
- Sriwijaya: history, religion & language of an early Malay polity. Collected studies by George Cœdès and Louis-Charles Damais, Kuala Lumpur, MBRAS, 1992

== Decorations ==
Cœdès received the following decorations:

- 1919 – Commander (Third Class) of the Most Exalted Order of the White Elephant, a royal decoration in the Honours System of Thailand
- 1926 –

== See also ==
- Indianized kingdoms
- Robert Lingat
