= Royal Thai General System of Transcription =

Official Thai romanization system

Royal Thai General System of Transcription RTGS
- Script type: romanization
- Creator: Royal Institute of Thailand
- Created: 1932
- Period: current
- Languages: Thai

The Royal Thai General System of Transcription (RTGS; Thai: หลักเกณฑ์การถอดอักษรไทยเป็นอักษรโรมันแบบถ่ายเสียงของราชบัณฑิตยสถาน) is the official system for rendering Thai words in the Latin script. It was published by the Royal Institute of Thailand in early 1917, when Thailand was called Siam.

It is used in road signs and government publications and is the closest method to a standard of transcription for Thai, but its use, even by the government, is inconsistent. The system is almost identical to the one that is defined by ISO 11940-2.

== Features ==
Prominent features of the system are:

- It uses only unmodified letters from the Latin alphabet without diacritics.
- It spells all vowels and diphthongs with vowel letters: ⟨a⟩, ⟨e⟩, ⟨i⟩, ⟨o⟩, ⟨u⟩.
  - Single letters ⟨a⟩, ⟨e⟩, ⟨i⟩, ⟨o⟩, ⟨u⟩ are monophthongs (simple vowels), with the same value as in the International Phonetic Alphabet (IPA).
  - Digraphs with trailing ⟨e⟩ are monophthongs; ⟨ae⟩, ⟨oe⟩, ⟨ue⟩ sound like /ɛ, ɤ, ɯ/ respectively.
  - Digraphs and trigraphs with trailing ⟨a⟩, ⟨i⟩, ⟨o⟩ are diphthongs and indicate IPA /a, j, w/ respectively.
- It uses consonants as in IPA except as follows:
  - Digraphs with ⟨h⟩ (⟨ph⟩, ⟨th⟩, ⟨kh⟩) are aspirated /pʰ, tʰ, kʰ/ consonants to distinguish them from unaspirated ⟨p⟩, ⟨t⟩, ⟨k⟩.
  - It uses ⟨ng⟩ for /ŋ/, as in English.
  - It uses ⟨ch⟩ for /tɕʰ/ and /tɕ/, somewhat like English.
  - It uses ⟨y⟩ for /j/, as in English.

Final consonants are transcribed according to pronunciation, not Thai orthography.

Vowels are transcribed in the position in the word where they are pronounced, not as in Thai orthography. Implied vowels, which are not written in Thai orthography, are transcribed as pronounced.

A hyphen is used to avoid ambiguity in syllable separation before a succeeding syllable that starts with a vowel and before ⟨ng⟩ if the preceding syllable ends with a vowel.

Transcribed words are written with spaces between them although there are no spaces in Thai. For example, สถาบันไทยคดีศึกษา Institute of Thai Studies is transcribed as Sathaban Thai Khadi Sueksa. However, compounds and names of persons are written without spaces between words. For example, ลูกเสือ (from ลูก + เสือ, 'scout') is transcribed as luksuea, not luk suea, and โชคชัย จิตงาม, the first and last names of a person, is transcribed as Chokchai Chitngam, not Chok Chai Chit Ngam.

== Transcription table ==
For consonants, the transcriptions are given for both initial and final position in the syllable. For vowels, a dash ("–") indicates the relative position of the vowel's initial consonant.

Consonants

Letter	Initial position	Final position
ก	k	k
ข ฃ ค ฅ ฆ	kh	k
ง	ng	ng
จ	ch	t
ฉ ช	ch	t
ซ	s	t
ฌ	ch	-
ญ	y	n
ฎ	d	t
ฏ	t	t
ฐ ฑ ฒ	th	t
ณ	n	n
ด	d	t
ต	t	t
ถ ท ธ	th	t
น	n	n
บ	b	p
ป	p	p
ผ	ph	-
ฝ	f	-
พ	ph	p
ฟ	f	p
ภ	ph	p
ม	m	m
ย	y	-
ร	r	n
ฤ	rue, ri, roe	-
ฤๅ	rue	-
ล	l	n
ฦ	lue	-
ฦๅ	lue	-
ว	w	-
ศ	s	t
ษ	s	t
ส	s	t
ห	h	-
ฬ	l	n
ฮ	h	-

Vowels

Letter	Romanization
–ะ, –ั, รร (with final), –า	a
รร (without final)	an
–ำ	am
–ิ, –ี	i
–ึ, –ื, —ือ	ue
–ุ, –ู	u
เ–ะ, เ–็, เ–	e
แ–ะ, แ–	ae
โ–ะ, –, โ–, เ–าะ, –อ	o
เ–อะ, เ–ิ, เ–อ	oe
เ–ียะ, เ–ีย	ia
เ–ือะ, เ–ือ	uea
–ัวะ, –ัว, –ว–	ua
ใ–, ไ–, –ัย, ไ–ย, –าย	ai
เ–า, –าว	ao
–ุย	ui
โ–ย, –อย	oi
เ–ย	oei
เ–ือย	ueai
–วย	uai
–ิว	io
เ–็ว, เ–ว	eo
แ–็ว, แ–ว	aeo
เ–ียว	iao

== History ==
There have been four versions of the RTGS, those promulgated in 1932, 1939, 1968 and 1999. The general system was issued by the Ministry of Public Instruction in 1932, and subsequent issues have been issued by the Royal Institute of Thailand.

=== Table of changes ===
Letter	Initial position				Final position			
Letter	1932	1939	1968	1999	1932	1939	1968	1999
จ	č	čh	ch	ch	t			
ฤ	rư	rư	ru	rue	-			
ฤ	rơ	rœ	roe	roe	-			
ฤๅ	rư	rư	ru	rue	-			
ฦ	lư	lư	lu	lue	-			
ฦๅ	lư	lư	lu	lue	-			

Letter	Romanization			
Letter	1932	1939	1968	1999
–ึ, –ื	ư	ư	u	ue
แ–ะ, แ–	e̩	æ	ae	ae
เ–าะ, –อ	o̦	ǫ	o	o
เ–อะ, เ–ิ, เ–อ	ơ	œ	oe	oe
เ–ือะ, เ–ือ	ưa	ưa	ua	uea
–อย	o̦i	ǫi	oi	oi
เ–ย	ơi	œi	oei	oei
เ–ือย	ưai	ưai	uai	ueai
–ิว	iu	iu	iu	io
แ–็ว, แ–ว	e̩o	æo	aeo	aeo
เ–ียว	iau	ieo	ieo	iao

=== 1932 version ===
The general system was set up by a committee of the Ministry of Public Instruction on the following principles:

1. The general system should be expandable to the precise system.
2. The general system should be based on pronunciation, and one sound should be represented by one symbol or letter.
3. The general system should be in consonance with the principles of Thai grammar, orthography, and pronunciation.
4. In selecting symbols or letters, account should be taken of existing types for printing and typewriting and of existing systems of transcription.

The committee considered that for the general system, tone and quantity marks were unneeded. They would be provided for the precise system. The marks are accents above the vowels, one reason that the vowel symbols used to have no marks above them.

=== 1939 version ===
The 1939 issue allowed short vowels to be marked with a breve (˘) where expedient. By contrast, the ALA-LC transliteration uses the 1939 version with the addition of a macron (¯) for long vowels and a spiritus asper (ʽ) to transliterate อ /ʔ/ as a consonant.

The changes in vowel notation copied existing usage (æ, œ) and IPA notation (æ, ǫ).

=== Relationship to precise system ===
The precise system was issued along with the general system in 1939. A transliteration in the precise system could be converted to the general system by doing the following:

1. Removing parenthesised character
2. Replacing ʽ and hʽ by h
3. Removing length and tone markings
4. Removing ḥ, which corresponds to ะ /ʔ/, which may be viewed as a length mark
5. Removing the character distinguishing dots below and primes
6. Changing ay and aiy to ai except before vowels
7. Changing č to čh
8. Changing ie to ia, uo to ua and ưœ to ưa

The last set of changes removes a graphic distinction between vowels in closed syllables and vowels in open syllables.

The h is added to č in the general system to make it easier to read. When the diacritic was subsequently removed, the h was justified as avoiding the misreading of the transliteration as /k/ or /s/ rather than the correct /tɕ/.

=== 1968 version ===
The 1968 version removed diacritics, including the horn of ư and replaced the ligatures æ and œ by ae and oe. While that is more suitable as the standard transliteration for maps, it removed the contrast between the transcriptions of จ /tɕ/ and ช /tɕʰ/, อึ /ɯ/ and อุ /u/, เอือ /ɯa/ and อัว /ua/, and โอ /oː/ and ออ /ɔː/.

=== 1999 version ===
The 1999 version restored the distinction between the transcriptions of the pairs อึ /ɯ/ and อุ /u/ and เอือ /ɯa/ and อัว /ua/. It also simplified the transliteration of final ว /w/, which now is always transcribed ⟨o⟩.

=== Allowed variants ===
The following variants have been allowed:

Preferred form	čh	æ	œ	ǫ	ơ	ư
Alternative	ĉh	ae	oe	o̦	oʼ	uʼ

== Criticism ==
The system does not transcribe all features of Thai phonology. Particularly it has the following shortcomings:

- It does not record tones.
- It does not differentiate between short and long vowels.
- The notation ⟨ch⟩ does not differentiate between IPA /tɕ/ and IPA /tɕʰ/ (see table below). Using ⟨c⟩ or ⟨j⟩ for /tɕ/ would have been more consistent with the other stops and is used as such in ISO 11940-2.
- The notation ⟨o⟩ does not differentiate between IPA /ɔ/ and IPA /o/ (see table below).

	Phoneme 1				Phoneme 2			
RTGS	Thai	IPA	Description	English	Thai	IPA	Description	English
ch	จ	tɕ	alveo-palatal affricate	roughly like ⟨ty⟩ in "let you"	ฉ, ช, ฌ	tɕʰ	aspirated alveo- palatal affricate	roughly like ⟨ch⟩ in "check"
o	โ–ะ, –	oʔ	close-mid back short rounded	like the vowel in "note" (American pronunciation)	เ–าะ	ɔʔ	open-mid back short rounded	like ⟨o⟩ in "boy"
o	โ–	oː	close-mid back long rounded	like ⟨o⟩ in "go" (Scottish English)	–อ	ɔː	open-mid back long rounded	like ⟨aw⟩ in "raw"

The original design envisioned the general system to give broad details of pronunciation, and the precise system to supplement that with vowel lengths, tones, and specific Thai characters used. The ambiguity of ⟨ch⟩ and ⟨o⟩ was introduced in the 1968 version.

== See also ==
- ISO 11940
- ISO 11940-2
- Thai transliteration

== Sources ==
- Nitaya Kanchanawan (July–September 2006), "Romanization, Transliteration, and Transcription for the Globalization of the Thai Language" (PDF), The Journal of the Royal Institute of Thailand, 31 (3)
