= ISO 11940-2 =

ISO standard for transcription of Thai

ISO 11940-2 is an ISO standard for a simplified transcription of the Thai language into Latin characters.

The full standard ISO 11940-2:2007 includes pronunciation rules and conversion tables of Thai consonants and vowels. It is a sequel to ISO 11940, describing a way to transform its transliteration into a broad transcription.

== Principle ==
The standard ISO 11940 (to be renamed 11940-1) defines a strict and reversible transliteration of Thai orthography into Latin characters, by means of a host of diacritics. The result bears no resemblance to Thai pronunciation. The additional standard ISO 11940-2 describes a set of rules to transform the transliteration resulting from ISO 11940 based on Thai orthography into a broad transcription based on pronunciation, using only unadorned Latin letters. All information on vowel length and syllable tone is dropped, as well as the distinction between IPA /o/ and /ɔ/.

The standard explicitly mentions that whenever the full pronunciation of each word is necessary or needed, conversion of long vowels can be devised and tone rules can be added to the system to achieve the full pronunciation of each word. However no rules are included how to achieve this.

=== Features ===
Although the standard is described as a procedure acting on the Thai orthography, the system is based on the pronunciation. Its rules can therefore be also described in terms of Thai phonology. Prominent features of ISO 11940-2 include:

- uses only unmodified letters from the Latin alphabet; no diacritics
- spells all vowels and diphthongs using only vowel letters: ⟨a⟩, ⟨e⟩, ⟨i⟩, ⟨o⟩, ⟨u⟩
  - single letters ⟨a⟩, ⟨e⟩, ⟨i⟩, ⟨o⟩, ⟨u⟩ are simple vowels with the same value as in the International Phonetic Alphabet (IPA)
  - digraphs with trailing ⟨e⟩ are simple vowels, ⟨ae⟩, ⟨oe⟩, ⟨ue⟩ sound like /ɛ, ɤ, ɯ/ respectively (and are perhaps chosen for their similarity to IPA ligatures: /æ, œ, ɯ/)
  - digraphs with trailing ⟨a⟩, ⟨i⟩, ⟨o⟩ are diphthongs, indicated by /a, j, w/ respectively in IPA
- uses consonants as in IPA, except:
  - uses ⟨c⟩ for /tɕ/
  - digraphs with ⟨h⟩ (⟨ph⟩, ⟨th⟩, ⟨kh⟩, ⟨ch⟩) are aspirated (/pʰ, tʰ, kʰ, tɕʰ/) consonants, to distinguish them from the separate unaspirated ⟨p⟩, ⟨t⟩, ⟨k⟩, ⟨c⟩ (/p, t, k, tɕ/)
  - uses ⟨ng⟩ for /ŋ/, as in English
  - uses ⟨y⟩ for /j/, as in English
  - uses ⟨'⟩ for a glottal stop /ʔ/, as occurs when a syllable starts with a vowel

Transcription is according to pronunciation, not Thai orthography, especially notable in final consonants. Vowels are transcribed in sequence as pronounced, not as written in Thai script. Implied vowels, which are not written in Thai script, are inserted as pronounced. Written silent letters are omitted.

== Result ==
The result of applying the rules described in the standard is almost identical to the transcription defined by the Royal Thai General System of Transcription. One exception is preceding a syllable initial vowel by ⟨'⟩, representing the Thai null consonant อ, obviating the need to insert a dash in some words to preserve syllable boundaries. The other exception is the retention of the aspiration characteristic of the alveolo-palatal affricate. So while Thai ฉ, ช, and ฌ, are represented by ⟨ch⟩ as in RTGS, the Thai letter จ is written as ⟨c⟩.

== Details ==
=== Consonants ===
==== Initials ====
In each cell below, the first line indicates International Phonetic Alphabet (IPA), the second indicates the Thai characters in initial position (several letters appearing in the same box have identical pronunciation). The third line shows the ISO 11940-2 rendering.

		Labial	Alveolar	Palatal	Velar	Glottal
Nasal		[m] ม m	[n] ณ, น n		[ŋ] ง ng	
Stop	tenuis	[p] ป p	[t] ฏ, ต t	[tɕ] จ c	[k] ก k	[ʔ] อ '
Stop	aspirated	[pʰ] ผ, พ, ภ ph	[tʰ] ฐ, ฑ, ฒ, ถ, ท, ธ th	[tɕʰ] ฉ, ช, ฌ ch	[kʰ] ข, ฃ, ค, ฅ, ฆ kh	
Stop	voiced	[b] บ b	[d] ฎ, ด d			
Fricative		[f] ฝ, ฟ f	[s] ซ, ศ, ษ, ส s			[h] ห, ฮ h
Approximant		[w] ว w	[l] ล, ฬ l	[j] ญ, ย y		
Trill			[r] ร r			

==== Finals ====
Of the consonant letters, excluding the obsolete ฃ and ฅ, six (ฉ, ผ, ฝ, ห, อ, ฮ) cannot be used as a final and the other 36 collapse into a very small repertoire of possible final consonant sounds and corresponding Latin letters. The consonants ย and ว when used as finals, form diphthongs and triphthongs with the preceding vowel, and ISO 11940-2 uses the vowel letters i and o in such cases.

	Labial	Alveolar	Palatal	Velar
Nasal	[m] ม m	[n] ญ, ณ, น, ร, ล, ฬ n		[ŋ] ง ng
Stop	[p] บ, ป, พ, ฟ, ภ p	[t] จ, ช, ซ, ฌ, ฎ, ฏ, ฐ, ฑ, ฒ, ด, ต, ถ, ท, ธ, ศ, ษ, ส t		[k] ก, ข, ค, ฆ k
Approximant	[w] ว o		[j] ย i	

=== Vowels ===
The basic vowels of the Thai language, from front to back and close to open, are given in the following table. The top entry in every cell is the symbol from the International Phonetic Alphabet, the second entry gives the spelling in the Thai alphabet, where a dash (–) indicates the position of the initial consonant after which the vowel is pronounced. A second dash indicates that a final consonant must follow. The third line contains the ISO 11940 symbol used.

	Front		Back			
	unrounded		unrounded		rounded	
	short	long	short	long	short	long
Close	/i/ -ิ	/iː/ -ี	/ɯ/ -ึ	/ɯː/ -ือ, -ื-	/u/ -ุ	/uː/ -ู
Close	i		ue		u	
Close-mid	/e/ เ-ะ, เ-ะ-	/eː/ เ-	/ɤ/ เ-อะ, เ-ิ-	/ɤː/ เ-อ, เ-ิ-, เ--	/o/ โ-ะ, --	/oː/ โ-
Close-mid	e		oe		o	
Open-mid	/ɛ/ แ-ะ, แ-็-	/ɛː/ แ-			/ɔ/ เ-าะ, -็อ-	/ɔː/ -อ, --
Open-mid	ae				o	
Open			/a/ -ะ, -ั-	/aː/ -า		
Open			a			

Thai vowels come in long-short pairs, forming distinct phonemes, but ISO 11940-2 represents both by the same symbol. Also the two phonemes IPA o and ɔ share a single Latin letter o.

The basic vowels can be combined into diphthongs and triphthongs.

Long		Short		ISO 11940-2
Thai	IPA	Thai	IPA	ISO 11940-2
–าว	/aːw/	เ–า	/aw/	ao
เ–ว	/eːw/	เ–็ว	/ew/	eo
แ–ว	/ɛːw/	–	–	aeo
–	–	–ิว	/iw/	io
เ–ียว	/iaw/	–	–	iao
เ–ีย	/iːa/	เ–ียะ	/ia/	ia
–ัว, -ว-	/uːa/	–ัวะ	/ua/	ua
เ–ือ	/ɯːa/	เ–ือะ	/ɯa/	uea
–าย	/aːj/	ไ–^{*}, ใ–^{*}, ไ–ย, -ัย	/aj/	ai
–อย	/ɔːj/	–	–	oi
โ–ย	/oːj/	–	–	oi
–ูย	/uːj/	–ุย	/uj/	ui
เ–ย	/ɤːj/	–	–	oei
–วย	/uaj/	–	–	uai
เ–ือย	/ɯaj/	–	–	ueai
