= Vanderbilt University =

Private university in Nashville, Tennessee, US

- Former names: Central University (1873–1877)
- Motto: Crescere aude (Latin)
- Motto in English: "Dare to grow"
- Type: Private research university
- Established: 1873; 153 years ago
- Accreditation: SACS
- Academic affiliations: AAU; COFHE; NAICU; ORAU; URA; space-grant
- Endowment: $12.7 billion (2026)
- Chancellor: Daniel Diermeier
- Provost: C. Cybele Raver
- Faculty: 1,847 (2023)
- Total staff: 6,654 (2023)
- Students: 13,575 (2024)
- Undergraduates: 7,221 (2024)
- Postgraduates: 6,354 (2024)
- Location: Nashville, Tennessee, United States; 36°08′51″N 86°48′09″W
- Campus: 330 acres (1.3 km^{2}); Large city
- Other campuses: Brentwood
- Newspaper: The Vanderbilt Hustler
- Colors: Black and gold
- Nickname: Commodores
- Sporting affiliations: NCAA Division I FBS – SEC; The American; CUSA
- Mascot: Mr. Commodore (Mr. C)
- Website: vanderbilt.edu

Vanderbilt University (informally Vandy or VU) is a private research university in Nashville, Tennessee, United States. Founded in 1873, it was named in honor of shipping and railroad magnate Cornelius Vanderbilt, who provided the school with its initial $1 million endowment in the hopes that his gift, and the greater work of the university, would help to heal the sectional wounds inflicted by the American Civil War. Vanderbilt is a founding member of the Southeastern Conference and has been the conference's only private school since 1966.

The university comprises eleven schools and enrolls nearly 13,800 students from the US and 70 foreign countries. Vanderbilt is classified among "R1: Doctoral Universities – Very high research activity". Several research centers and institutes are affiliated with the university, including the Robert Penn Warren Center for the Humanities, the Freedom Forum First Amendment Center, and Dyer Observatory. Vanderbilt University Medical Center, formerly part of the university, became a separate institution in 2016. In 2025-2026, Vanderbilt opened campuses in New York City, San Francisco, and West Palm Beach.

Vanderbilt alumni, faculty, and staff have included 9 Nobel Prize winners, 1 Dan David Prize winner, 2 vice presidents of the United States, 13 governors, 2 US Supreme Court justices, 54 current and former members of the United States Congress, and 18 US ambassadors. Other notable alumni include 3 Pulitzer Prize winners, 27 Rhodes Scholars, 2 Academy Award winners, 1 Grammy Award winner, 6 MacArthur Fellows, 4 foreign heads of state, and 5 Olympic medalists. Vanderbilt has more than 145,000 alumni, with 40 alumni clubs established worldwide.

== History ==
=== Founding and early years ===
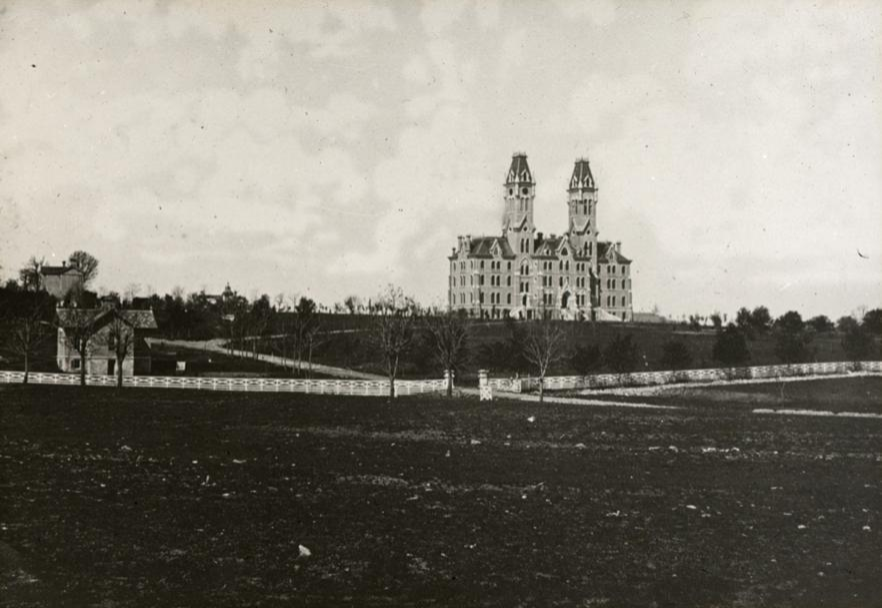
Vanderbilt University campus circa 1875

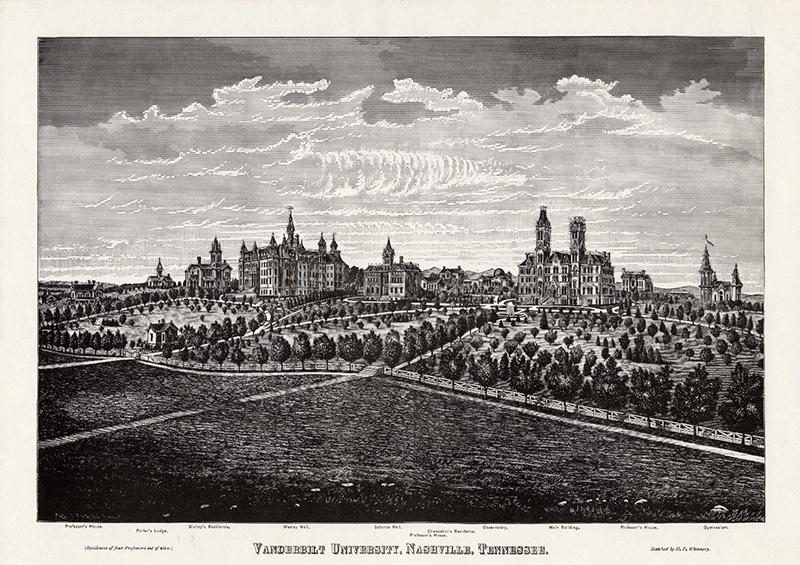
Vanderbilt University, sketched in 1880 by H.P. Whinnery

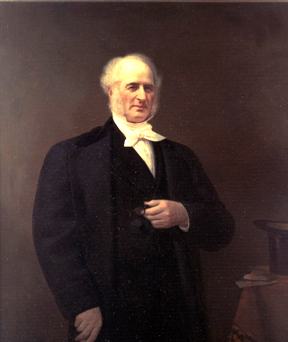
Cornelius Vanderbilt, the university's namesake

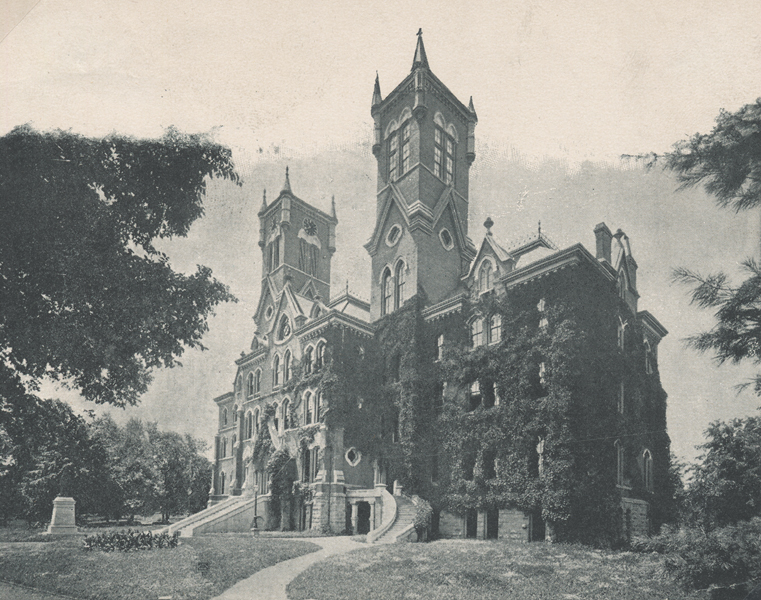
Main Building before the fire

In the years before the American Civil War of 1861–1865, the Methodist Episcopal Church South had been considering the creation of a regional university for the training of ministers in a location central to its congregations. Following lobbying by Nashville bishop Holland Nimmons McTyeire, church leaders voted to found "The Central University of the Methodist Episcopal Church, South" in Nashville in 1872. However, lack of funds and the ravaged state of the Reconstruction Era South delayed the opening of the college.

The following year, McTyeire stayed at the New York City residence of Cornelius Vanderbilt. Vanderbilt's second wife, Frank Armstrong Crawford Vanderbilt (1839–1885), was a cousin of McTyeire's wife, Amelia Townsend McTyeire (1827–1891), and both women were from Mobile, Alabama. Cornelius Vanderbilt, the wealthiest man in the United States at the time, had been planning to establish a university on Staten Island, New York. However, McTyeire convinced him to donate $500,000 to endow Central University in order to "contribute to strengthening the ties which should exist between all sections of our common country".

Vanderbilt eventually increased the endowment to $1 million (roughly $27 million in 2025), and though he never expressed any desire that the university be named after him, McTyeire and his fellow trustees rechristened the school in the Spring of 1873 in his honor. They acquired land from Confederate Congressman Henry S. Foote, who had built Old Central, a house still standing on campus.

The first building, Main Building, later known as Kirkland Hall, was designed by William Crawford Smith, and its construction began in 1874. In the fall of 1875, about 200 students enrolled at Vanderbilt, and in October the university was dedicated. Bishop McTyeire was named chairman of the Board of Trust for life by Vanderbilt as a stipulation of his endowment. McTyeire named Landon Garland (1810–1895), his mentor from Randolph-Macon College, as chancellor. Garland shaped the school's structure and hired the school's faculty. Most of this faculty left after disputes with Bishop McTyeire, including over pay rates. When the first fraternity chapter, Phi Delta Theta, was established on campus in 1876, it was shut down by the faculty, only to be reestablished as a secret society in 1877. In 1880, Old Gym, a Victorian building designed by Peter J. Williamson, was completed and became the university's first gymnasium. By 1883, the Board of Trust passed a resolution allowing fraternities on campus, and more chapters were established in 1884.

Following the Tennessee Centennial and International Exposition, a statue of Cornelius Vanderbilt, designed by Italian sculptor Giuseppe Moretti, was moved from the grounds of the Parthenon to the Vanderbilt campus.

In 1905, Main Building (Kirkland Hall), which originally had two Victorian towers, burnt down and was rebuilt in an Italianate design with a single 170-foot tower after the university received donations totaling over $50,000. There is speculation that the school initially intended to rebuild both towers of the original Kirkland Hall but lacked the funds to do so.

==== Connections to slavery ====
Many of the university's early leaders had prominent ties to slavery and the Confederacy before the Civil War. Frank Vanderbilt was "a Confederate sympathizer" during the Civil War. McTyeire was born into a slave-owning family and authored an essay in favor of slavery. Garland owned "up to 60 slaves" before the Civil War.

One of the founding trustees, Hezekiah William Foote, was a Confederate veteran and the owner of four plantations in Mississippi, including Mount Holly. The Treasurer of the Board of Trust from 1872 to 1875, Alexander Little Page Green, whose portrait hangs in Kirkland Hall, was a Methodist preacher and a former slave owner. His son-in-law, Robert A. Young, was a Methodist minister who served as the Financial Secretary on the Board of Trust from 1874 to 1882, retiring from the board in 1902. The Elliston family, who owned slaves, donated some of their Burlington Plantation, in one of the first expansions of the campus.

=== Split with the Methodist Church ===
During the first 40 years, the Board of Trust, and therefore the university, was under the control of the General Conference (the governing body) of the Methodist Episcopal Church, South. Tension grew between the university administration and the Conference over the future of the school, particularly over the methods by which members of the Vanderbilt Board of Trust would be chosen, and the extent that non-Methodists could teach at the school.

Conflicts escalated after James H. Kirkland was appointed chancellor in 1893. Then the Southern Methodist Church congregations raised just $50,000 in a campaign to raise $300,000.

Meanwhile, the Board of Trust voted to limit Methodist representation on the board to just five bishops. Former faculty member and bishop Elijah Hoss led a group attempting to assert Methodist control. In 1910, the board refused to seat three Methodist bishops. The Methodist Church took the issue to court and won at the local level. On March 21, 1914, the Tennessee Supreme Court ruled that the Commodore, and not the Methodist Church, was the university's founder and that the board could therefore seat whomever it wished. The General Conference in 1914 voted 151 to 140 to sever its ties with Vanderbilt; it also voted to establish a new university, Southern Methodist University, and to greatly expand Emory University.

Colonel Edmund William Cole, the treasurer of the Board of Trust, was a Confederate veteran and a railroad executive. He is the namesake of the annual Cole Lecture; his marble bust and his wife's portrait can be seen in Kirkland Hall. His son, Whitefoord Russell Cole, who was the chairman of the Board of Trust from 1915 to 1934, defended Chancellor Kirkland's decision to split with the Methodist Church. He is the namesake of Cole Hall, completed in 1949.

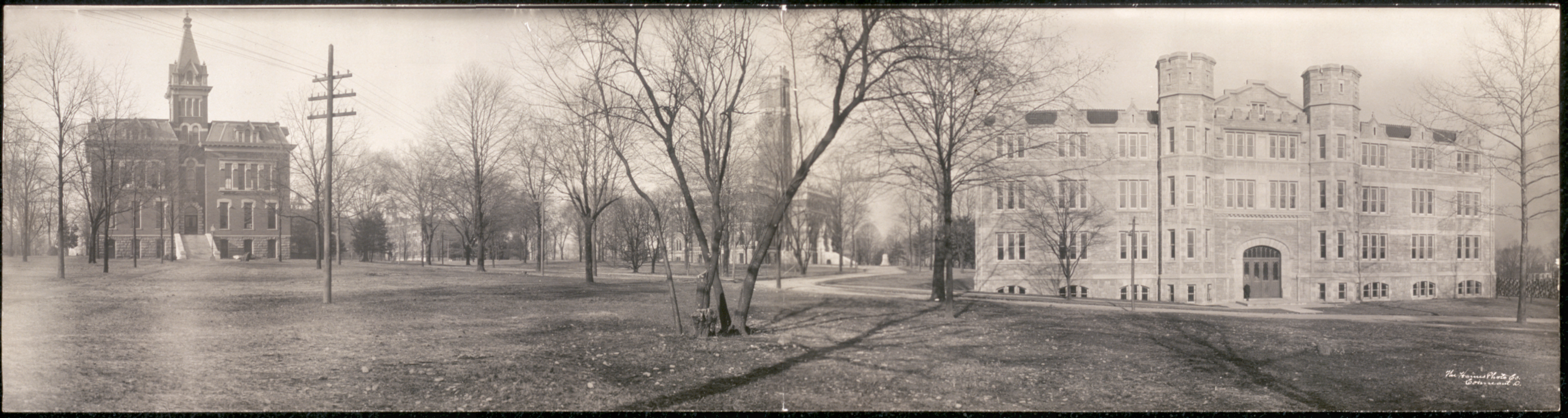
Benson Hall, Kirkland Hall, and Furman Hall in 1909

=== 1920s through World War II ===
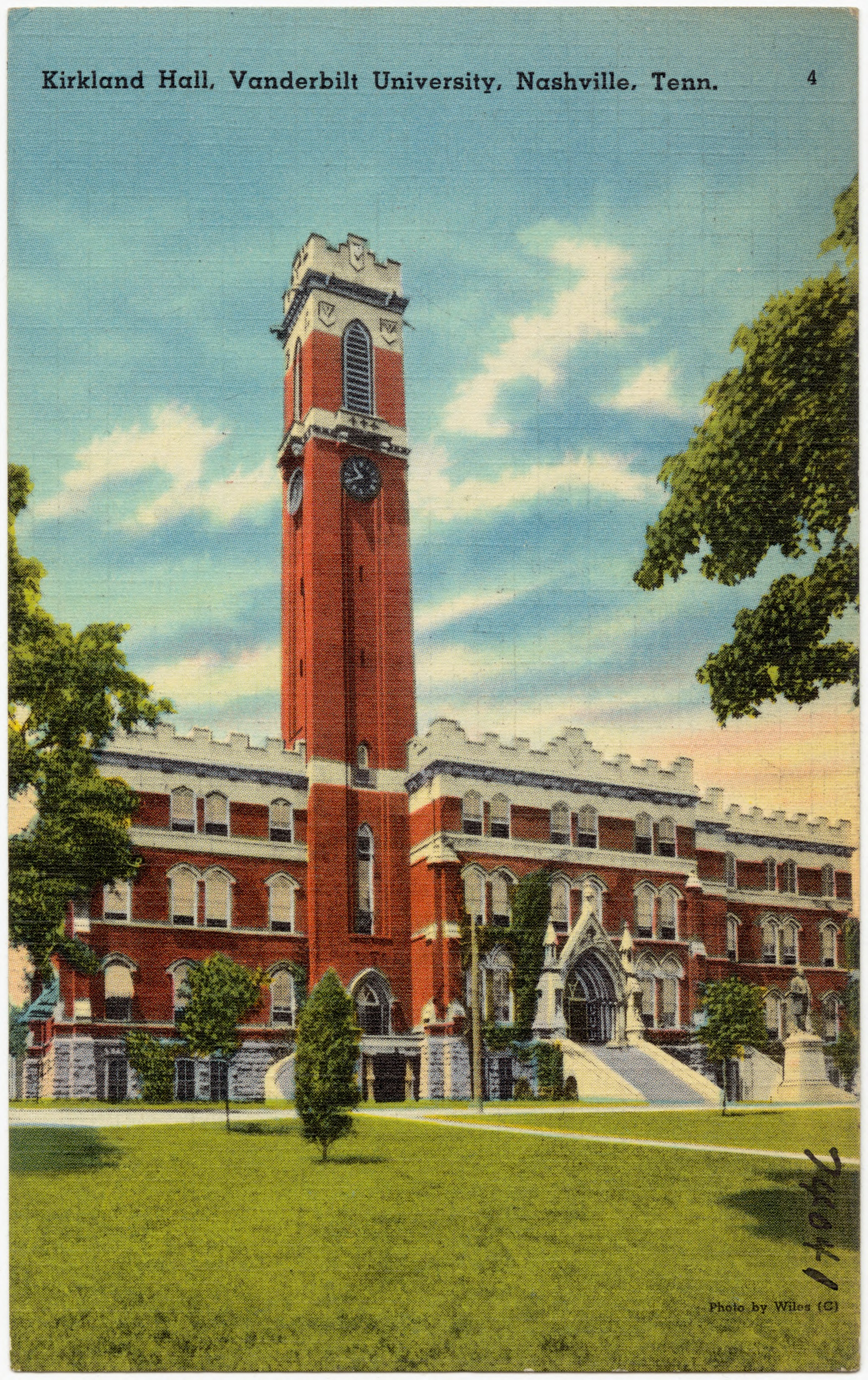
Postcard of Kirkland Hall circa 1930

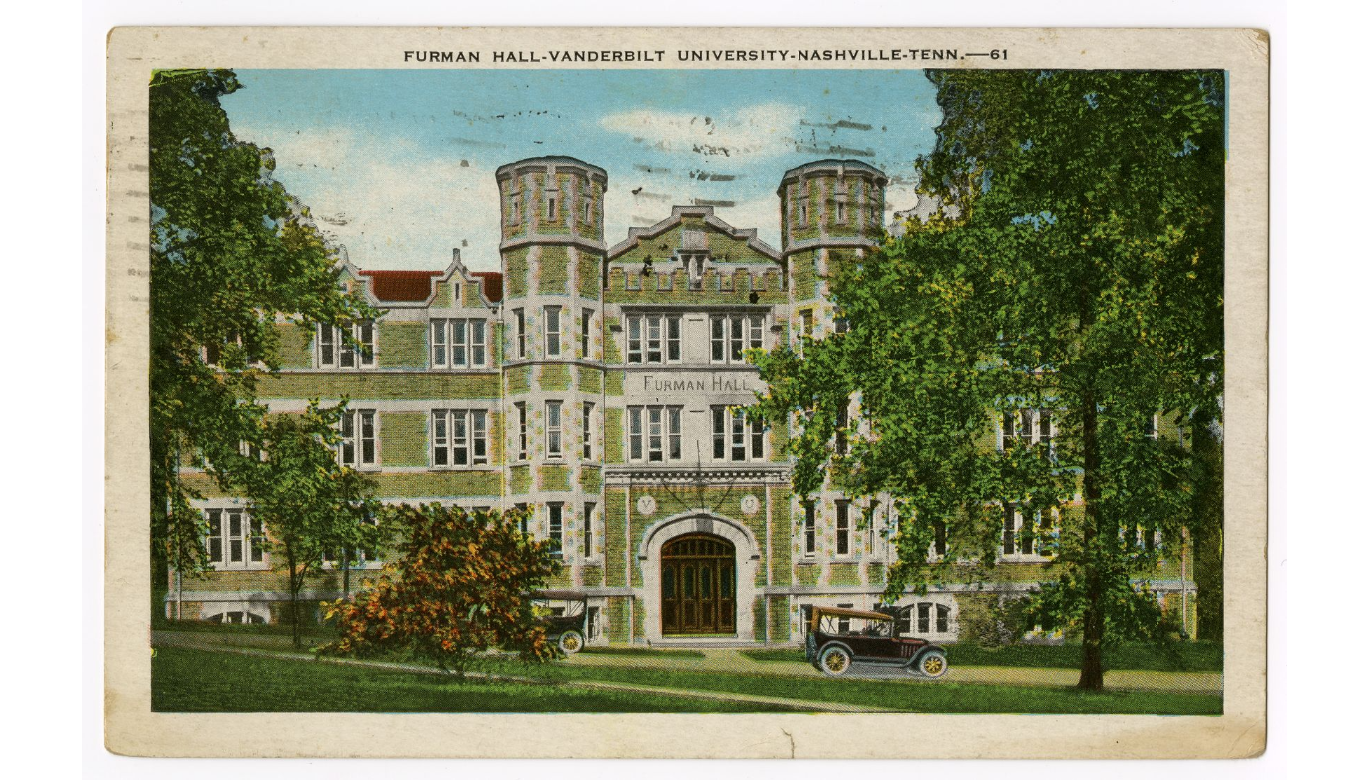
Postcard of Furman Hall circa 1930

In the 1920s and 1930s, Vanderbilt University hosted two partly overlapping groups of scholars who had a large impact on American thought and letters: the Fugitives and the Agrarians. Meanwhile, Frank C. Rand, who served as the President and later Chairman of the International Shoe Company, donated US$150,000 to the university in 1925; Rand Hall was subsequently named for him.

In 1928, the construction of three more buildings was completed: Garland Hall, named for Chancellor Landon Garland; Buttrick Hall, named for Wallace Buttrick of the General Education Board; and Calhoun Hall, named for William Henry Calhoun, a silversmith and Odd Fellows Grand Master.

In 1933, the United Daughters of the Confederacy donated $50,000 (roughly $925,166 in 2015 dollars) for the construction of Confederate Memorial Hall, designed by architect Henry C. Hibbs. It was completed in 1935.

In the 1930s, Ernest William Goodpasture and his colleagues in the School of Medicine invented methods for cultivating viruses and rickettsiae in fertilized chicken eggs. This work made possible the production of vaccines against chicken pox, smallpox, yellow fever, typhus, Rocky mountain spotted fever and other diseases caused by agents that only propagate in living cells. Alfred Blalock, Professor of Surgery, and his assistant Vivien Thomas identified a decrease in blood volume and fluid loss outside the vascular bed as a key factor in traumatic shock and pioneered the use of replacement fluids for its treatment. This treatment saved countless lives in World War II, during which Vanderbilt was one of 131 colleges and universities nationally that took part in the V-12 Navy College Training Program which offered students a path to a Navy commission.

German biophysicist Max Delbrück joined the Department of Physics in 1940, and in the following year, he met Italian microbiologist Salvador Luria. In 1942, they published on bacterial resistance to virus infection mediated by random mutation. The culminating Luria–Delbrück experiment, also called the Fluctuation Test, demonstrated that Darwin's theory of natural selection acting on random mutations applies to bacteria as well as to more complex organisms. The 1969 Nobel Prize in Physiology or Medicine was awarded to both scientists.

==== Radioactivity experiments ====
Shortly after the war, from 1945 to 1947, researchers at Vanderbilt University conducted an experiment funded by the Rockefeller Foundation where they gave 800 pregnant women radioactive iron without their consent, being told that they were receiving "vitamin drinks" that would improve the health of babies. Four of the women's babies died from cancer as result of the experiment, and the women suffered from rashes, bruises, hair/tooth loss, anemia, and cancer. In a lawsuit the women received $9.1 million from Vanderbilt University and $900,000 from the Rockefeller Foundation in 1998.

=== 1950s and 1960s ===
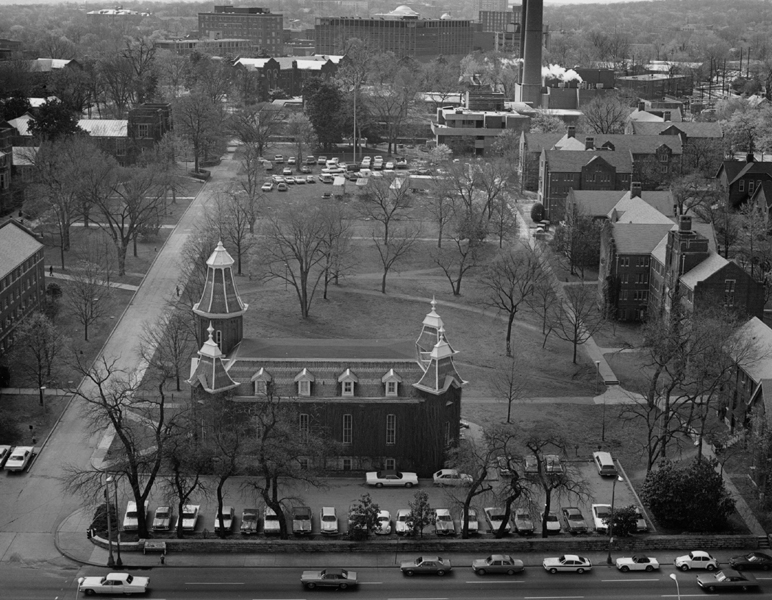
Aerial image of the Old Gym and Alumni Lawn

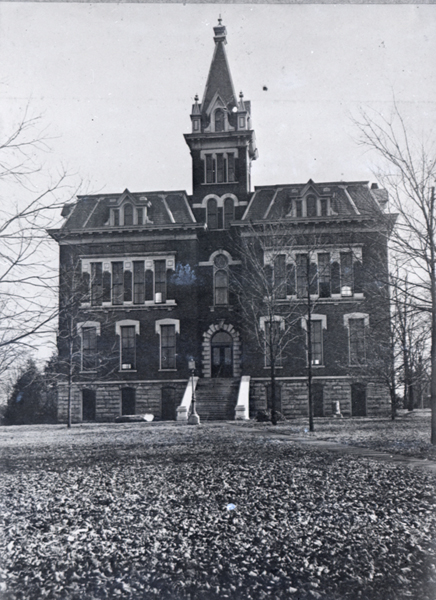
Benson Hall

In the early 1950s, some of the first women graduated as engineers. Women's rights advocate Maryly Van Leer Peck graduated as the first chemical engineer in 1951 after not being able to study this field at Georgia Tech where her father was president. In 1953, Chancellor Branscomb orchestrated admission of the first African American student to Vanderbilt, in the School of Divinity. In 1960, under intense pressure from the Vanderbilt Board of Trust, especially James G. Stahlman, a Trustee and the influential editor of the local newspaper, Branscomb expelled Divinity student James Lawson. Lawson was a Congress of Racial Equality leader who organized sit-ins in defiance of Nashville's segregation laws. A dozen faculty members resigned in protest. Branscomb later re-examined his decision, regretting he did not consider referring it to committee to delay action for three months until Lawson's graduation. The school was placed on probation for a year by the American Association of Theological Schools, and the power of trustees was curtailed. The university took Stahlman's $5 million donation in 1972–1973, and named a professorship in his honor. In 2005, Lawson was re-hired as a Distinguished University Professor for the 2006–2007 academic year. He was named a Distinguished Alumnus for his achievements.

In May 1962 the Board of Trustees approved a recommendation from Chancellor Branscomb to admit African Americans in all of the university's educational schools. The first black undergraduates entered the school in the fall of 1964. The university drew national attention in 1966 when it recruited Perry Wallace, the first African American to play varsity basketball in the Southeastern Conference (SEC). Wallace, from Nashville, played varsity basketball for Vanderbilt from 1967 to 1970, and faced considerable opposition from segregationists when playing at other SEC venues. In 2004, a student-led drive to retire Wallace's jersey finally succeeded. (Note: Contrary to widely stated belief, however, Wallace was not the first African-American athlete in the SEC: Stephen Martin, who was attending Tulane University on an academic scholarship, walked on to Tulane's baseball team in his sophomore season of 1966 (1965–66 school year), and earned letters in that season as well as the 1967 and 1968 seasons. Martin is often overlooked as an SEC integration pioneer because his first season of 1966 was Tulane's last as an SEC member.; At the same time that Wallace and another African-American basketball player, Godfrey Dillard (who transferred from Vanderbilt before playing in a varsity game), enrolled as scholarship athletes at Vanderbilt, the University of Kentucky enrolled two African-American scholarship football players, Nate Northington and Greg Page. Since freshmen were not eligible to play varsity sports at the time, players who enrolled in school in 1966 could not play on varsity teams until 1967. Because the football season precedes the basketball season within the school year, both were set to become the first African-American scholarship athletes in the SEC, but Page suffered a paralyzing spinal cord injury in a 1967 preseason practice and died from the complications on September 29, less than a week after Northington became the SEC's first black scholarship athlete when he played his first game for Kentucky.)

In 1964, Vanderbilt held its first IMPACT Symposium, which has since become a university tradition of hosting speakers in a multi-day annual symposium to discuss current events and topics of a controversial nature. Participants have included Martin Luther King Jr., Allen Ginsberg, Stokely Carmichael, Strom Thurmond, Robert F. Kennedy, Margaret Thatcher, Madeleine Albright, Vicente Fox, Ehud Barak, and multiple Presidents of the United States.

=== 1970s to present ===
In March 1978, Vanderbilt hosted the South African tennis team in Memorial Gymnasium for the Davis Cup. The match was disrupted by anti-apartheid protesters who chanted "Don't play with apartheid", and a copy editor for The Tennessean was removed by police.

In 1979, Vanderbilt acquired Peabody College, then called the "George Peabody College for Teachers", residing on 53 acres adjacent to the university. Peabody College traces its history to the 1785 Davidson Academy.

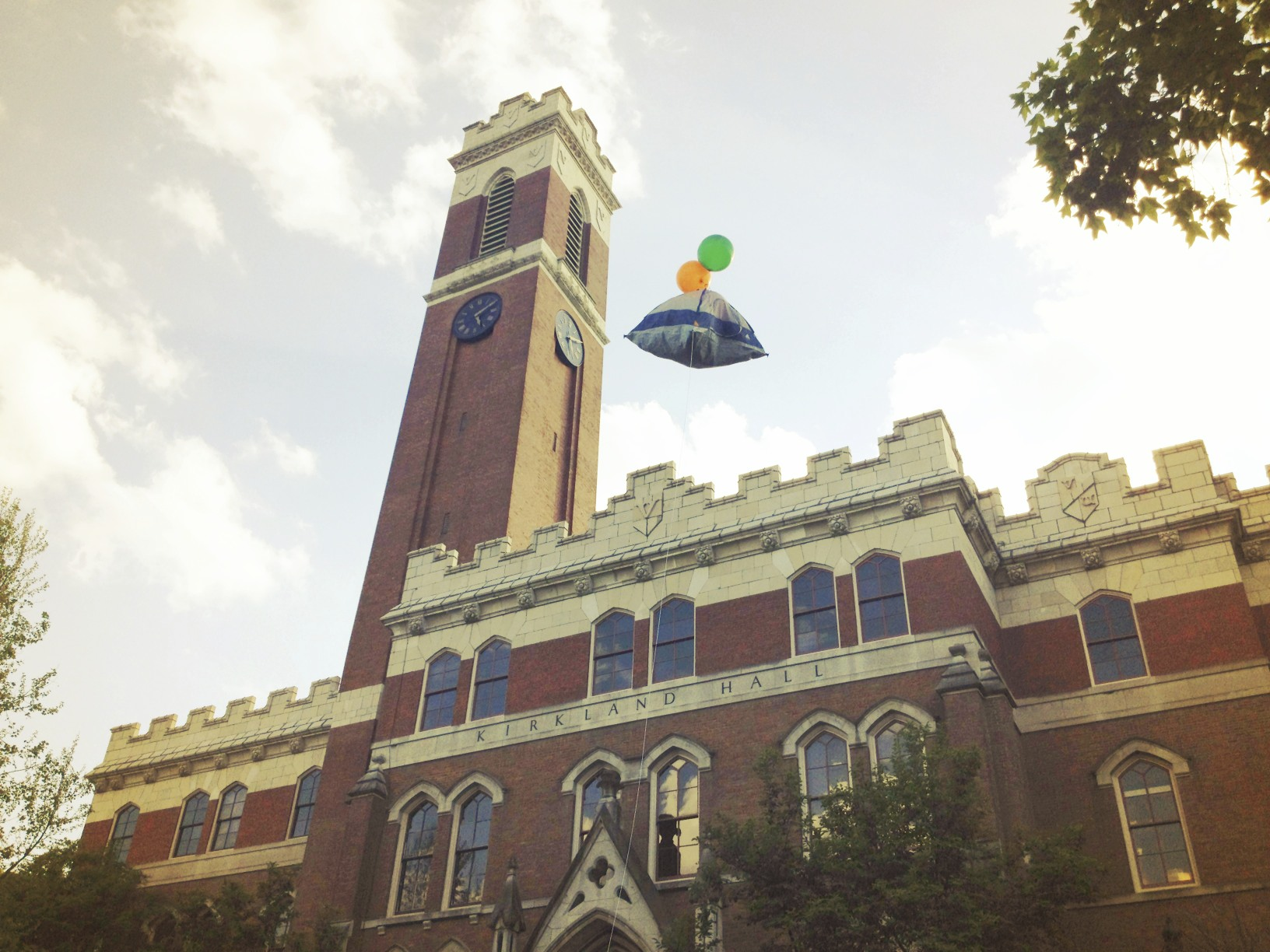
Kirkland Hall in 2012

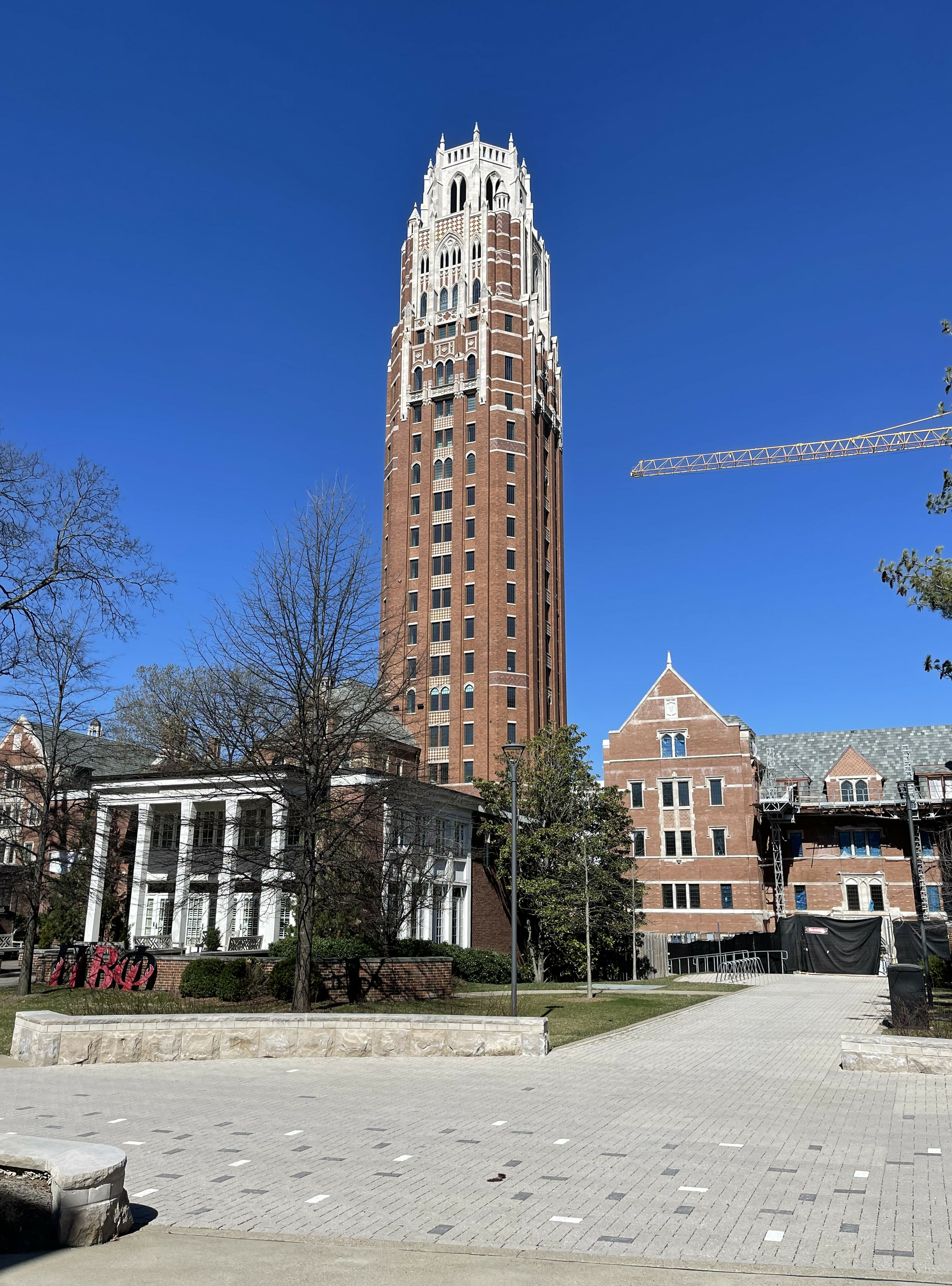
Zeppos College

In the early 1980s, Vanderbilt University was an investor the Corrections Corporation of America prior to its IPO. The company was co-founded by Thomas W. Beasley, a Vanderbilt Law School alumnus who was honored with a Distinguished Alumnus Award.

In 1989, the university began offering Posse Foundation scholarships to groups of promising young leaders from urban backgrounds to increase their share of diverse students. By 1995, 4.23% of the undergraduate student body was African-American.

In 2001, the university determined to remodel the undergraduate experience by creating an academic residential college system. Since then Vanderbilt has been constructing new buildings and renovating existing structures to support the college system.

In 2002, the university decided to rename Confederate Memorial Hall, a residence hall on the Peabody campus to Memorial Hall. Nationwide attention resulted, in part due to a lawsuit by the Tennessee chapter of the United Daughters of the Confederacy. The Davidson County Chancery Court dismissed the lawsuit in 2003, but the Tennessee Court of Appeals ruled in May 2005 that the university must pay damages based on the present value of the United Daughters of the Confederacy's contribution if the inscription bearing the name "Confederate Memorial Hall" was removed from the building or altered. The Court of Appeals' decision has been critiqued by legal scholars. In late July 2005, the university announced that although it had officially renamed the building, and all university publications and offices will refer to it solely as Memorial Hall, the university would neither appeal the matter further, nor remove the inscription and pay damages. In August 2016, the university agreed to remove the word "Confederate" from the building after "anonymous donors" donated $1.2 million to repay the United Daughters of the Confederacy.

In 2009, Vanderbilt instituted a no-loan policy. The policy states that any student granted admission and a need-based aid package will have an award that includes no student loans. Following this, in 2015, Vanderbilt implemented Opportunity Vanderbilt, which committed the university to need-blind admissions, meeting 100% of demonstrated financial need of admitted students, and including only grants in awards.

In 2011, the Oakland Institute exposed a university investment in EMVest Asset Management, a private equity firm "accused of 'land grabbing,' or taking over agricultural land used by local communities through exploitative practices for large-scale commercial export farming in five sub-Saharan African countries. The revelation led to student protests in 2012. By 2013, Vanderbilt administrators had divested from EMVest.

In 2012, Vanderbilt built Elliston Hall in honor of Elizabeth Boddie Elliston of the Burlington Plantation.

In 2015, Vanderbilt opened a new innovation center, the Wond'ry, as part of its Academic Strategic Plan. The three-story, 13,000-square foot building is meant to serve as an interdisciplinary hub of knowledge for the Vanderbilt community, serving as the location of hackathons, partnerships with the Nashville Entrepreneurship Center, and several social venture programs.

In April 2024, Vanderbilt University students joined other campuses in support of Palestine by setting up an encampment on campus. The protestors demanded that the university boycott companies that do business in Israel and demanded an end to what they call a Palestinian genocide. The protests escalated when the administration blocked a student vote on a BDS resolution. Students were forcibly removed by police from a building and three were arrested for misdemeanor assault, with those three students later expelled. More than 170 faculty members opposed the university's response to the protests. With the start of the 2024–25 academic year, Vanderbilt required all first-year undergraduate students to attend mandatory meetings about the university's approach to free speech.

== Academics ==
Undergraduate admission statistics
	Fall 2025	Fall 2024	Fall 2023	Fall 2022	Fall 2021
First-time Freshmen
Applicants	48,196	45,409	45,313	46,377	47,152
Admits	2,593	2,662	2,844	3,093	3,368
Admit rate	5%	6%	6%	7%	7%
Enrolled	1,635	1,630	1,622	1,619	1,626
Yield rate	63%	61%	57%	52%	48%
Transfers
Applicants	3,177	3,202	2,932	2,833	2,450
Admits	831	698	553	471	430
Admit rate	26%	22%	19%	17%	18%
Enrolled	446	359	280	243	240
Yield rate	54%	51%	51%	52%	56%

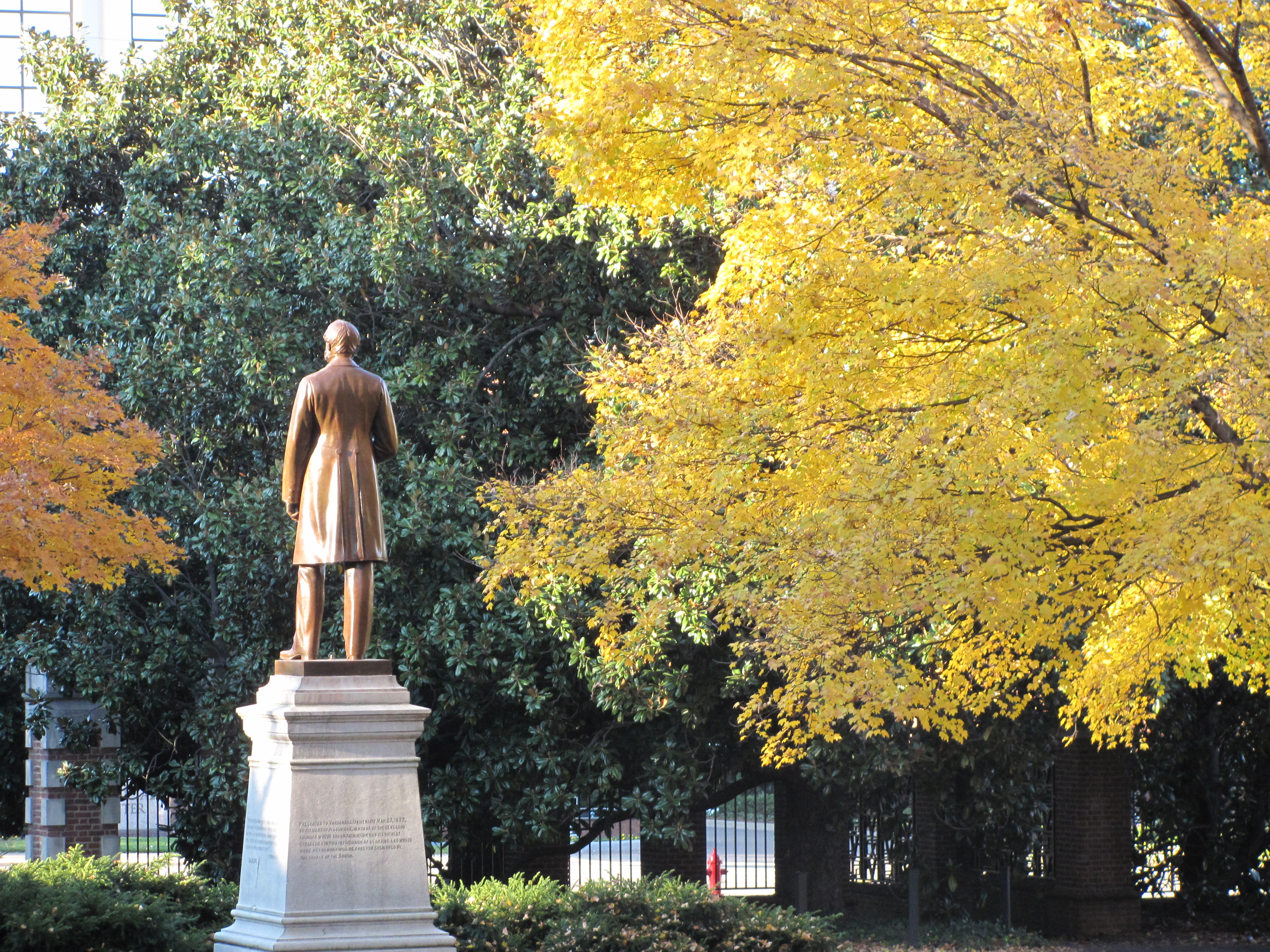
Giuseppe Moretti's statue of Cornelius Vanderbilt

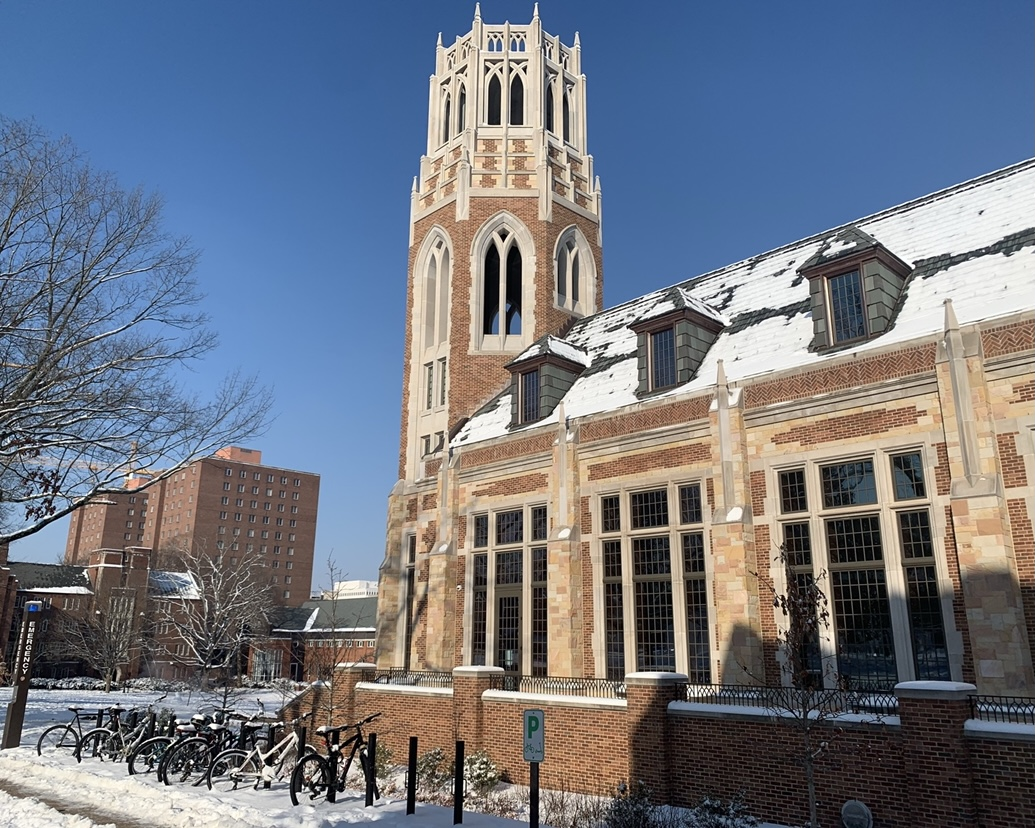
E. Bronson Ingram College

As of 2021, Vanderbilt had an enrollment of 7,111 undergraduate and 6,685 graduate and professional students, for a total of 13,796 students. Students from all 50 states and more than 100 countries attend Vanderbilt, with approximately 68% of the undergraduate student body coming from outside the South and 10% from outside of the United States. As of 2022, the incoming undergraduate class was 49% male and 51% female. Moreover, 12.7% of the class was classified as Hispanic, 11.9% Black or African American, 16.9% Asian, 6% other/two or more races, and 10.4% international. 88% of Vanderbilt's students graduate in four years and 93% within six years. 97% of first-years return for their second year.

Vanderbilt lets undergraduates choose among 70 majors, or create their own, in its four undergraduate schools and colleges: the College of Arts and Science, the School of Engineering, Peabody College of Education and Human Development, and Blair School of Music. The university also has six graduate and professional schools, including the Divinity School, Graduate School, Law School, School of Medicine, School of Nursing, and Owen Graduate School of Management. As of 2021, Vanderbilt had a student-to-faculty ratio of 8:1.

The university's undergraduate programs are highly selective: in 2022, Vanderbilt's acceptance rate and yield rate were 6.1% and 52.3%, respectively. Vanderbilt is one of the most selective universities in the United States.

In 2015, Vanderbilt was ranked fifth overall and fourth among private universities in enrollment of National Merit Scholars. In its most recent annual comparison of admissions selectivity, The Princeton Review gave Vanderbilt a rating of 99 out of 99. The class of 2023 included 231 National Merit Scholars and 116 valedictorians or salutatorians. Additionally, the class had standardized test scores that were well above average: the interquartile range (25th percentile – 75th percentile) of SAT scores was 1460–1560, while the interquartile range of ACT scores was 33–35. For students of the class of 2016 whose schools reported exact class rankings, 93% ranked in the top 10% of their class.

=== Research ===
According to the National Science Foundation, Vanderbilt spent $1 billion on research and development in 2021, ranking it 24th among American universities. In 2013, Vanderbilt University was ranked 12th in the country in funding from the National Institutes of Health. Its Institute for Space and Defense Electronics, housed in the Department of Electrical Engineering and Computer Science, includes the largest academic facility in the world involved in radiation-effects research.

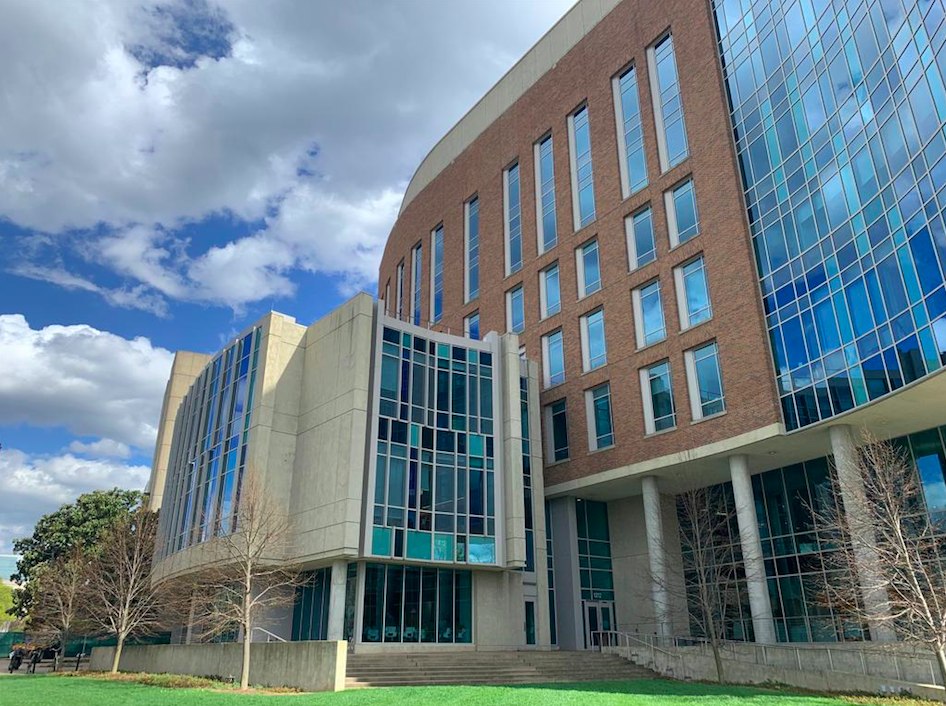
The Wond'ry is Vanderbilt's Center for Innovation and Design.

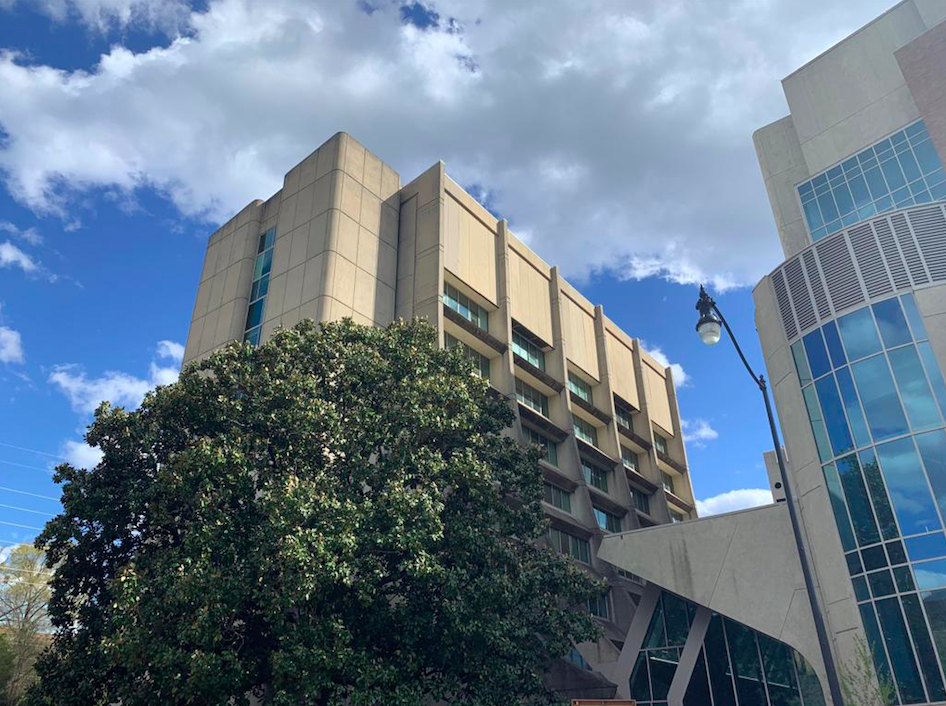
Olin Hall, adjacent to The Wond'ry

Among its more unusual activities, the university has institutes devoted to the study of coffee and of bridge. Indeed, the modern form of the latter was developed by Harold Stirling Vanderbilt, a former president of the university's Board of Trust and a great-grandson of the Commodore. In addition, in mid-2004 it was announced that Vanderbilt's chemical biology research may have serendipitously opened the door to the breeding of a blue rose, something that has long been coveted by horticulturalists and rose lovers.

In 2010, the Center for Intelligent Mechatronics at Vanderbilt began testing a powered exoskeleton intended to assist paraplegics, stroke victims and other paralyzed or semi-paralyzed people to walk independently. The Vanderbilt exoskeleton received funding from Parker Hannifin Corporation in 2012 and has since gone to market internationally.

Vanderbilt was involved in the discovery of tennessine (Ts), element 117 on the periodic table, in collaboration with the Joint Institute for Nuclear Research in Moscow Oblast, Russia and the Oak Ridge National Laboratory. It was officially named after the state of Tennessee by the International Union of Pure and Applied Physics in 2016.

The university's research record is blemished, however, by a study university researchers, in conjunction with the Tennessee Department of Health, conducted on iron metabolism during pregnancy in the 1940s. Between 1945 and 1949, over 800 pregnant women were given radioactive iron. Standards of informed consent for research subjects were not rigorously enforced at that time, (Note: See article on the Declaration of Helsinki.) and many of the women were not informed of the potential risks. The injections were later suspected to have caused cancer in at least three of the children who were born to these mothers. In 1998, the university settled a class action lawsuit with the mothers and surviving children for $10.3 million.

=== Rankings ===
Academic rankings

National
- Forbes: 10
- U.S. News & World Report: 16 (tie)
- Washington Monthly: 22
- WSJ/College Pulse: 44

Global
- ARWU: 62
- QS: 250
- THE: 90 (tie)
- U.S. News & World Report: 66 (tie)

National program rankings (as of 2026)
Program	Ranking
Audiology	1
Biological Sciences	26
Business	16
Chemistry	40
Clinical Psychology	9
Computer Science	46
Earth Sciences	55
Economics	32
Education	5
Engineering	29
English	26
History	22
Law	12
Mathematics	39
Nursing: Master's	5
Nursing–Midwifery	1
Physics	34
Political Science	18
Psychology	8
Public Health	31
Sociology	32
Speech–Language Pathology	1

Global program rankings
Program	Ranking
Arts & Humanities	125
Biology & Biochemistry	92
Chemistry	351
Clinical Medicine	23
Economics & Business	248
Engineering	577
Immunology	40
Materials Science	416
Microbiology	78
Molecular Biology & Genetics	44
Neuroscience & Behavior	83
Pharmacology & Toxicology	87
Physics	288
Psychiatry/Psychology	78
Social Sciences & Public Health	111
Space Science	169

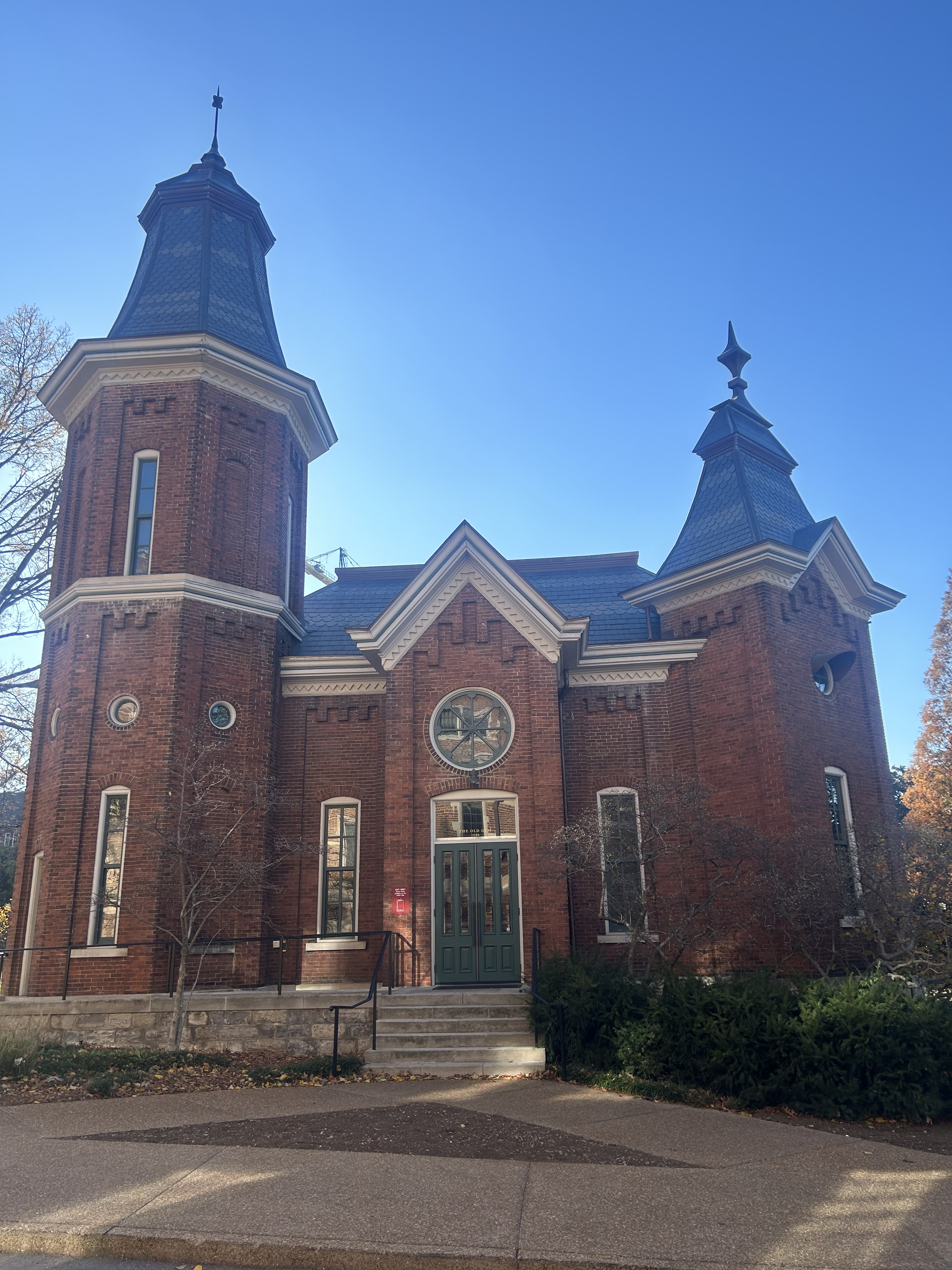
Built in 1880 with funding from William Henry Vanderbilt, the Old Gym now houses the Office of Undergraduate Admissions.

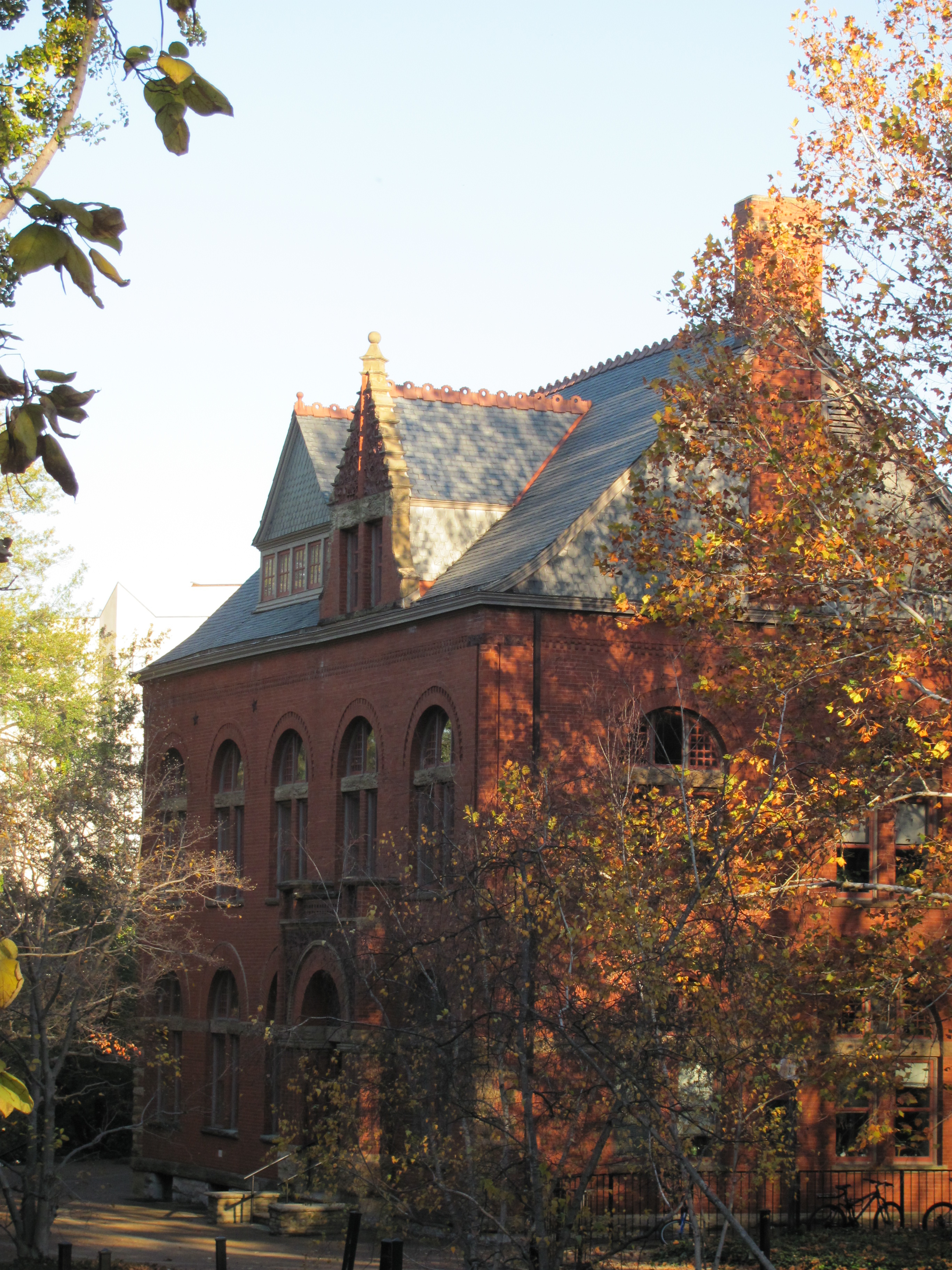
Old Mechanical, now part of the Owen Graduate School of Management

Vanderbilt consistently ranks among the top universities in the United States. In the 2026 edition of 'Best National Universities' by U.S. News & World Report, Vanderbilt ranked 16th in a tie with Rice University, Brown University, and Washington University in St. Louis. In 2026, Niche ranked Vanderbilt the 7th best college in America, and the 15th hardest college to get into in America.

In the 2024 graduate program rankings, U.S. News & World Report ranked the Peabody College of Education the 2nd best national school of education, the Vanderbilt University Law School the 14th best national law school, the Vanderbilt University School of Medicine the 5th best national research-oriented medical school, the Vanderbilt University School of Nursing the 4th best national nursing school, the School of Engineering the 41st best national engineering school, and the Owen Graduate School of Management the 18th best national business school. Additionally, U.S. News & World Report ranked Vanderbilt 1st in the nation in the fields of special education, educational administration, and audiology. In 2024, the Owen Graduate School of Management was ranked 25th by Bloomberg Businessweek among full-time MBA programs.

The Academic Ranking of World Universities ranks Vanderbilt as the 64th-best university in the world. Additionally the ARWU Field rankings in 2022 placed Vanderbilt as fourth best in the world for Education and Library & Information Science, 14th in Law, and 20th in Political Science. In the Times Higher Education 2016 World University Rankings, Vanderbilt is 87th. The 2023 QS World University Rankings ranked Vanderbilt 199th in the world. Human Resources & Labor Review, a national human competitiveness index & analysis, ranked the university as one of 50 Best World Universities in 2011. Poets & Writers ranked Vanderbilt's English Department's MFA Program in Creative Writing 18th among the top 50 writing programs in the United States in 2010 and 14th in the United States in 2011. Fortune magazine ranked Vanderbilt among the top 100 places to work in the United States, the only university on their list. In 2018, Kiplinger's Best College Values rankings listed Vanderbilt as one of the top ten "best value" universities and one of the top five private universities for value. In 2020, Money's "Best Colleges in America, Ranked by Value" rankings listed Vanderbilt as being the eighth-best value university in the nation.

Vanderbilt is ranked the 98th best university in the world in the Times Higher Education World University Rankings. Reuters ranked it the 19th most innovative university in the world.

Vanderbilt does well in non-academic rankings as well. In 2017 alone, the university was ranked first for happiest students, second for quality of life, fifth for most beautiful campus, and fifth for best-run college by The Princeton Review. In 2016, the university was listed by Travel + Leisure as having one of the most beautiful campuses in the country. In 2016, Vanderbilt was ranked the third most intense college in the nation by Business Insider. In 2018, the magazine listed Vanderbilt as the fifth smartest college in America.

== Campus ==
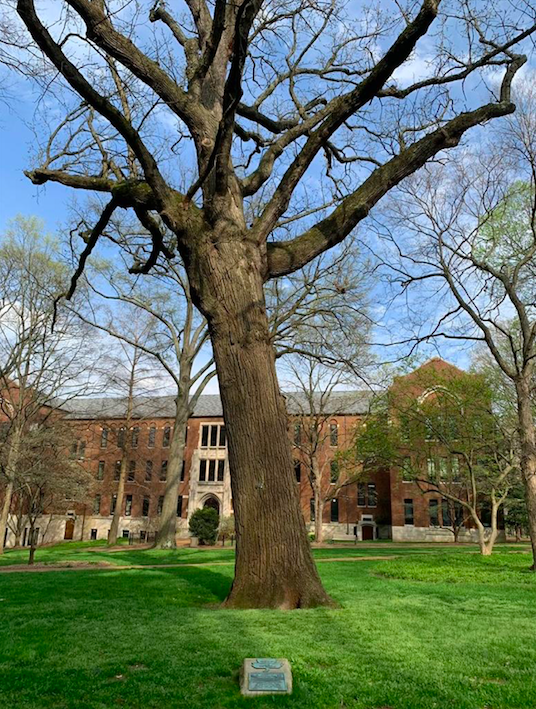
Bicentennial Oak, as seen facing Garland Hall, pre-dates the Revolutionary War.

The Vanderbilt campus is located approximately 1.5 miles (2.4 km) southwest of downtown in Midtown along both the city's bustling West End Avenue and 21st Avenue corridors. It has an area of 330 acres (1.3 km^{2}), though this figure includes large tracts of sparsely used land in the southwest part of the main campus, as well as the Medical Center. The historical core of campus encompasses approximately 75 acres (0.3 km^{2}).

The oldest part of the Vanderbilt campus is known for its abundance of trees and green space, which stand in contrast to the surrounding cityscape of urban Nashville. The campus was designated as a national arboretum in 1988 by the Association of Botanical Gardens and Arboreta, and in 2020 it was accredited as a Level II arboretum by ArbNet. Approximately 190 species of trees and shrubs can be found on campus. One tree, the Bicentennial Oak between Rand Hall and Garland Hall, was certified to have lived during the American Revolution and was the oldest living thing on the campus. The Bicentennial Oak succumbed to age-related decay and fell on November 12, 2022. In December 2015, a hackberry tree fell, leaving 10 students injured with "broken bones and stitches." Additionally, in August 2022, a tree fell on Peabody Lawn, leaving two students injured.

=== Main campus ===
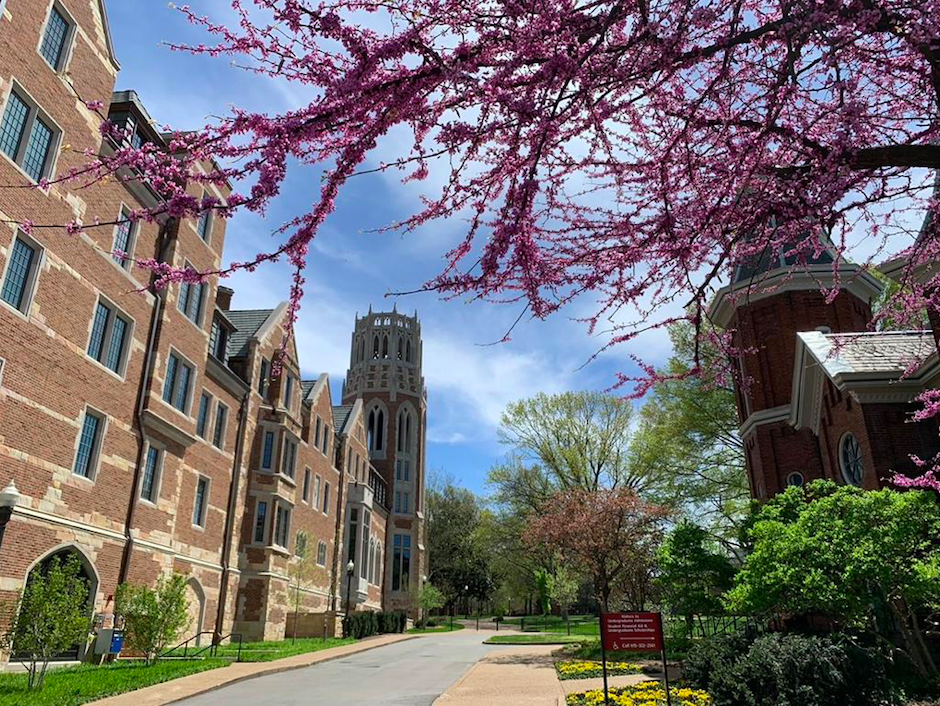
Between the Old Gym and E. Bronson Ingram College

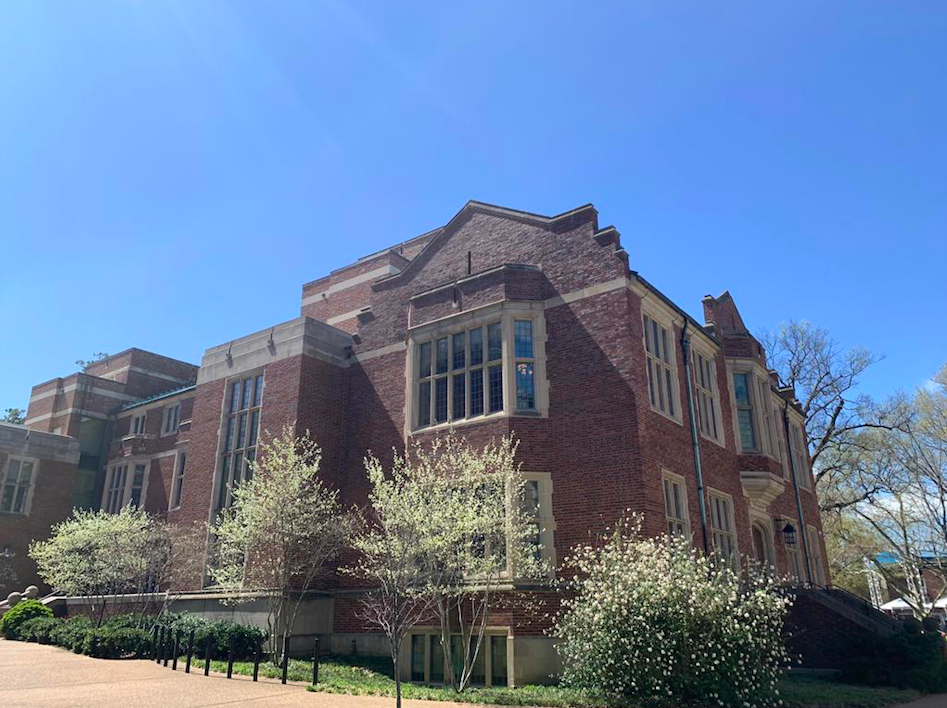
Alumni Hall

In the northeast corner of the campus (the base of the fan) is the original campus. This section stretches from West End Avenue south to the Stevenson Center and west from 21st Avenue to Alumni Lawn. The majority of the buildings of the arts and humanities departments of the College of Arts and Science, as well as the facilities of the law school, Owen Graduate School of Management, and the divinity school, are located in the original campus. Additionally, the Heard Central Library and Sarratt Student Center/Rand Hall can be found on the original campus.

Flanking the original campus to the south are the Stevenson Center for Science and Mathematics—built on a woodland once known as the Sacred Grove—and the School of Engineering complex (Jacobs Hall-Featheringill Hall). Housing the Science Library, the School of Engineering, and all the science and math departments of the College of Arts and Science, this complex sits between the original campus and the Medical Center. The Vanderbilt University Medical Center itself takes up the southeastern part of the campus. Besides the various associated hospitals and clinics and the facilities of the Schools of Medicine and Nursing, the medical center also houses many major research facilities.

West of the original campus and the Medical Center, Greek Row and the bulk of the Vanderbilt residence halls are found. From north to south, Carmichael Towers, Greek Row, Branscomb Quadrangle, and Highland Quadrangle house the vast majority of on-campus residents in facilities ranging from the double-occupancy, shared-bathroom dorms in Branscomb and Towers to the apartments and lodges in Highland Quadrangle. There are 20 residence halls and apartments across both campuses.

The design of the campus and buildings can be described as eclectic, with buildings of various styles and eras. The original 75-acre campus included 11 structures situated along ridge lines with sprawling views of downtown Nashville. The original campus gates are still located off 21st Avenue. Currently four of the original 11 campus structures still exist. One of these is Kirkland Hall, one of the more recognizable buildings on campus. Built in 1873, the original building had two Victorian towers. A major fire in 1905 severely damaged the building, and it was rebuilt in an Italianate design with only one tower. The building was named after Chancellor James Hampton Kirkland, who served as Vanderbilt's chancellor from 1893 to 1937. In recent years campus planners have strived to preserve the landscape and buildings like Kirkland Hall to keep the original core and maintain a compact, walkable campus.

Memorial Gymnasium, Vanderbilt Stadium, Hawkins Field, McGugin Center, and all the other varsity athletic fields and facilities are to be found in the extreme west of campus. The Student Recreation Center and its associated intramural fields are located south of the varsity facilities.

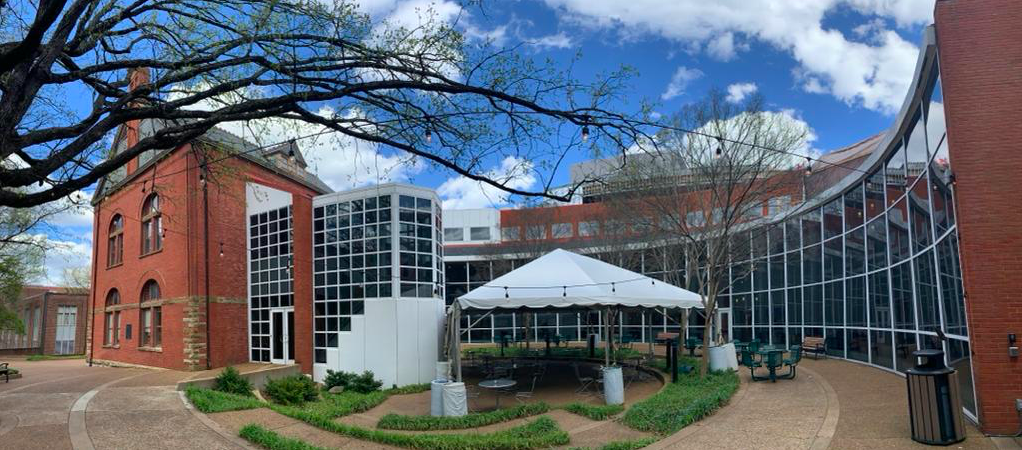
View of the Owen Graduate School of Management

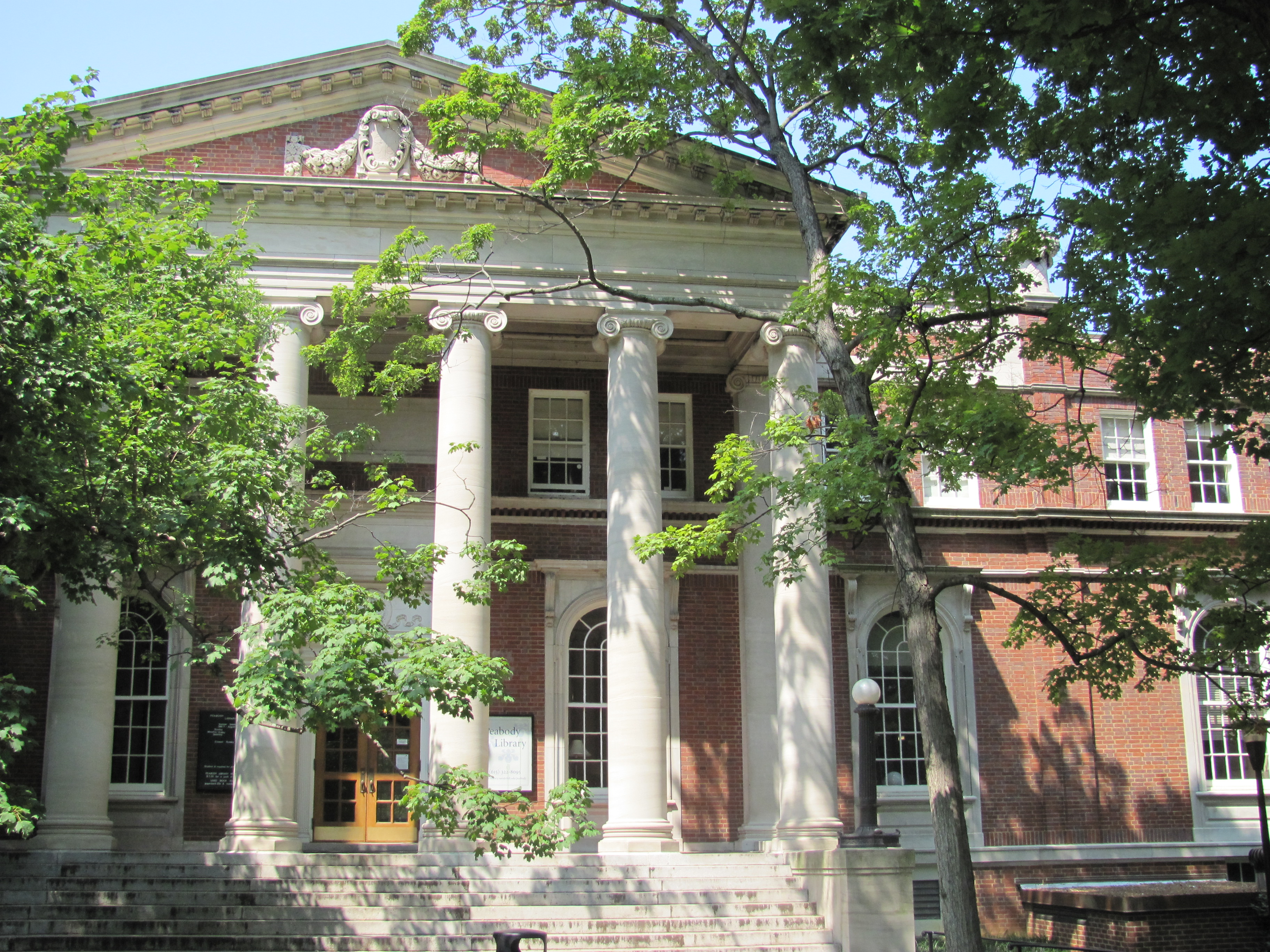
Peabody Library

=== Commons campus ===
Directly across 21st Avenue from the Medical Center sits "Commons", home to the Peabody College of Education and Human Development. The design of the Commons campus was inspired by the classical lines of Thomas Jefferson's design for the University of Virginia and the architecture of the 1893 World's Columbian Exposition in Chicago, Illinois. The National Historic Landmarks program designated the central lawn and surrounding buildings as a historic district in 1965. The Commons campus also includes the Martha Rivers Ingram Commons freshman residences. All freshmen live across the 10 various dormitories of the Ingram Commons.

=== New York campus ===
On September 6, 2024, Vanderbilt University entered into a lease agreement to occupy the General Theological Seminary campus in Chelsea, Manhattan pending approval from the government authorities. Vanderbilt made it clear that General Theological Seminary would continue to occupy some space on the New York City campus, but would remain a separate entity. The use of this location has not been announced.

=== Palm Beach campus ===
Vanderbilt is currently planning a $520 million campus to be located in Palm Beach, Florida to hold around 1,000 graduate students. In 2024, the city of Palm Beach approved two acres to be donated. As of January 2026, Vanderbilt has raised $300 million as part of its fundraising goal. Its Palm Beach campus will "focus on finance, engineering and technology" and is expected to be complete by 2029.

=== San Francisco campus ===
On July 28, 2025, Vanderbilt was revealed to be in talks with the city of San Francisco about opening a downtown campus. Subsequently on January 13, 2026, the university announced that it would be acquiring the campus of the California College of the Arts and would begin operating the new campus in 2027.

== Organization and administration ==
College/school	Year founded
Arts and Science	1873
Law	1874
Medicine	1874
Divinity	1875
Education and Human Development	1875, incorporated into Vanderbilt 1979
Graduate School	1879
Engineering	1886
Nursing	1908
Music	1964, incorporated into Vanderbilt 1986
Management	1969

Vanderbilt University, as a private corporation, is wholly governed by an independent, self-perpetuating Board of Trust. The board comprises 45 regular members (plus any number of trustees emeriti) and the chancellor, the university's chief executive officer. Each trustee serves a five-year term (except for four recently graduated alumni, who serve two two-year terms). Bruce R. Evans is the board's chairman.

Daniel Diermeier has served as chancellor of Vanderbilt University since July 1, 2020.

=== Administration history ===
Since the opening of the university in 1875, only nine individuals have served as chancellor. Landon Garland was the university's first chancellor, serving from 1875 to 1893. Garland organized the university and hired its first faculty. Garland Hall, an academic building on campus, is named in his honor.

The next chancellor was James Kirkland—serving from 1893 to 1937, he had the longest tenure of any Vanderbilt chancellor. He was responsible for severing the university's ties with the Methodist Church and relocating the medical school to the main campus. Vanderbilt's Main Building was renamed Kirkland Hall after Kirkland left in 1937.

The longest-tenured chancellor was followed by one of the shortest-tenured. Oliver Carmichael served Vanderbilt for just nine years, 1937 to 1946. Carmichael developed the graduate school, and established the Joint University Libraries for Vanderbilt, Peabody, and Scarritt College. Carmichael Towers, a set of high-rise dormitories on the northern edge of campus, were named for Chancellor Carmichael.

Carmichael's successor was Harvie Branscomb. Branscomb presided over a period of major growth and improvement at the university that lasted from 1946 until 1963. He was responsible for opening the admissions policy to all races. Branscomb Quadrangle is a residence hall complex named for the chancellor.

Alexander Heard, for whom the campus's 10-library system (with 3.3 million total volumes) is named, served as chancellor from 1963 to 1982. During his 20-year tenure, the Owen Graduate School of Management was founded, and Vanderbilt's merger with Peabody College was negotiated. He also survived calls for his ouster because of his accommodating stance on desegregation.

Joe B. Wyatt was the chancellor who served immediately after Heard, from 1982 until 2000. Wyatt oversaw a great increase in the university's endowment, an increase in student diversity, and the renovation of many campus buildings. Wyatt placed great emphasis on improving the quality of faculty and instruction, and during his tenure Vanderbilt rose to the top 25 in the U.S. News & World Report's annual rankings for the first time. The Wyatt Center on Peabody's campus is named for Wyatt and his wife.

Gee was appointed chancellor by the Board of Trust in February 2000. After allegations of lavish spending in 2005, the Board of Trust established a committee to monitor his personal spending more closely.

After Gordon Gee's departure in 2007, Zeppos was named interim chancellor. He was named chancellor suo jure on March 1, 2008, by the university's Board of Trust. In April 2019, Zeppos announced his intention to resign from the chancellorship on August 1, 2019. On December 4, 2019, it was announced that Daniel Diermeier would be the next chancellor. Diermeier took office on July 1 of the next year.

=== Medical Center ===
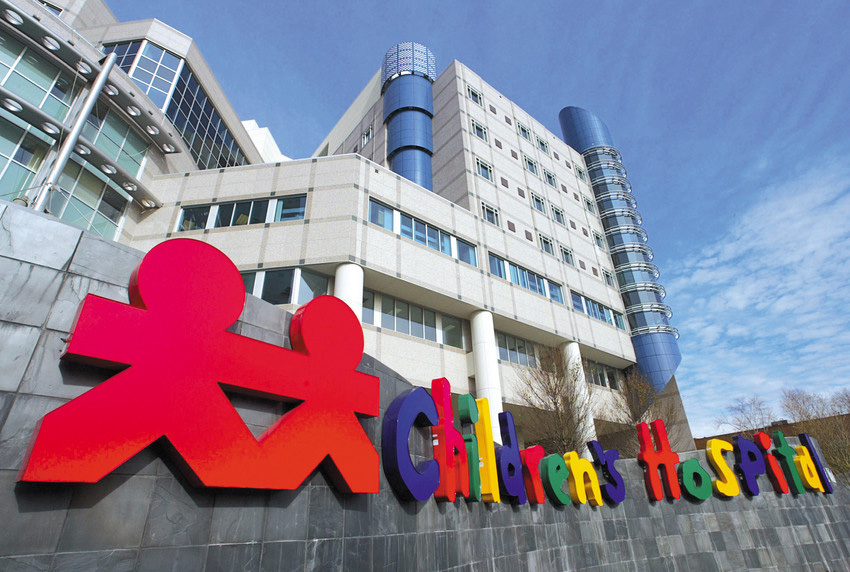
The entrance of the Monroe Carell Jr. Children's Hospital at Vanderbilt

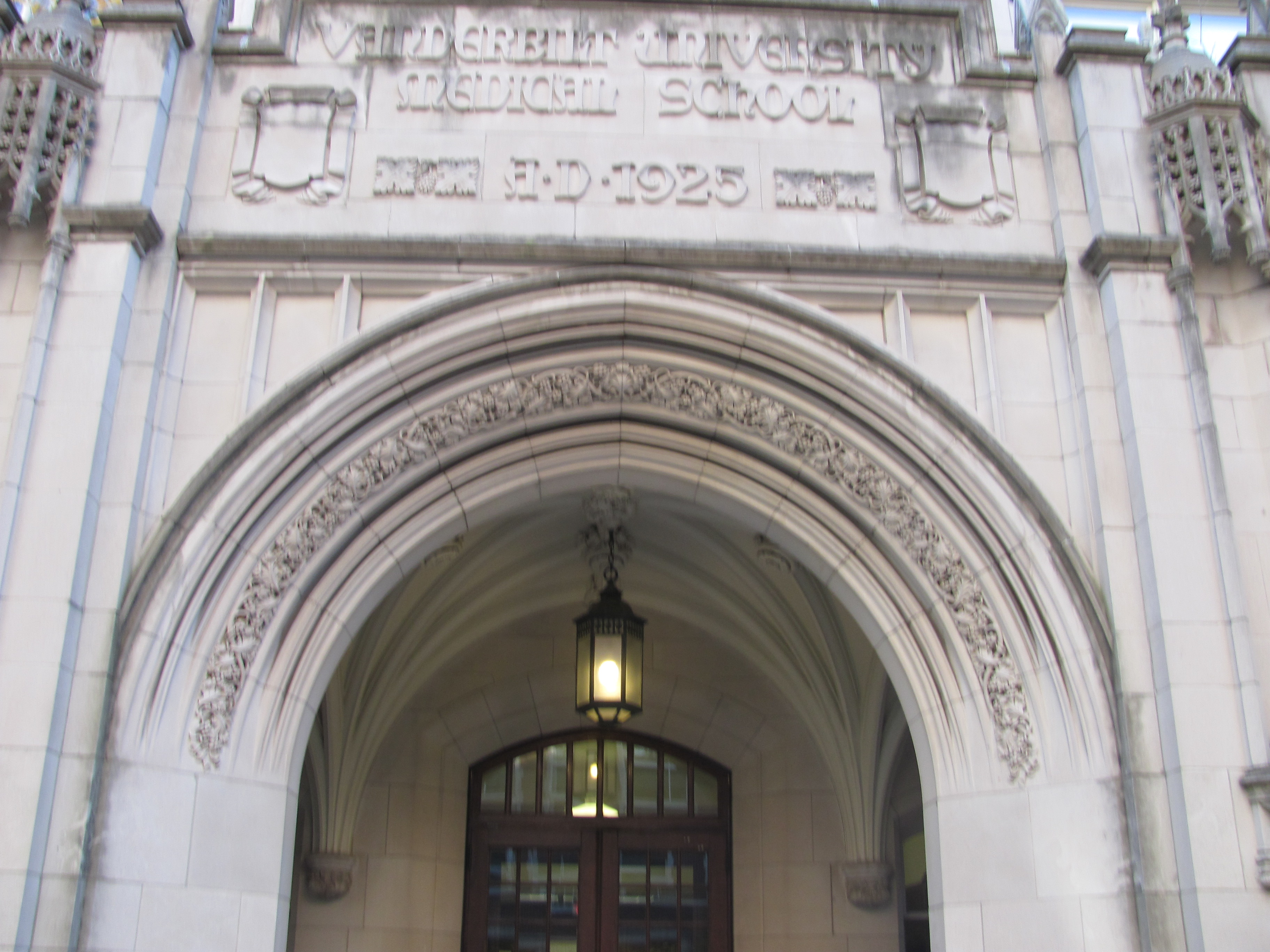
The entrance of Vanderbilt University School of Medicine

Until April 2016 Vanderbilt University Medical Center (VUMC) was a component of the university, but is now an independent organization. The Medical Center continues to cooperate with the university and many clinical staff serve as faculty members at Vanderbilt University School of Medicine and Vanderbilt University School of Nursing. As of April 2016, VUMC comprised the following units: Vanderbilt University Hospital, Monroe Carell Jr. Children's Hospital at Vanderbilt, Vanderbilt-Ingram Cancer Center, Vanderbilt Psychiatric Hospital, Vanderbilt Clinic, Vanderbilt Bill Wilkerson Center, Vanderbilt Stallworth Rehabilitation Hospital, Eskind Biomedical Library, Vanderbilt Sports Medicine, Dayani Human Performance Center, Vanderbilt Page Campbell and Heart Institute.

Before splitting with VUMC, Vanderbilt was the largest private employer in Middle Tennessee and the second largest in the state with over 23,000 employees. Approximately 74% of the university's faculty and staff were employed by the Medical Center. In 2008, the medical center was placed on the Honor Roll of U.S. News & World Report's annual rating of the nation's best hospitals, ranking 15th overall in the country.

=== Undergraduate schools and colleges ===
The College of Arts and Science confers the Bachelor of Arts degree on undergraduates, and, in conjunction with the Graduate School, the Master of Arts, Master of Science, and the Doctor of Philosophy degrees on graduate students. The college occupies nearly 1.1 million square feet in 23 buildings across the Nashville campus.

The school is the oldest and the largest of Vanderbilt's constituent colleges. The college played host to two notable literary movements, the Fugitives and the Southern Agrarians; John Crowe Ransom was a member of the English department. Robert Penn Warren is an alumnus of the college, and the school still hosts the Robert Penn Warren Center for the Humanities.

The college provides a liberal-arts-based education that requires the completion of 14 courses. The general requirements of the curriculum are outlined in the AXLE (Achieving Excellence in Liberal Education) framework. These include courses in Humanities and the Creative Arts, International Cultures (along with proficiency in a foreign language), History and Culture of the United States, Mathematics and Natural Sciences, Social and Behavioral Sciences, Perspectives, and three writing courses.

The college provides academic resources and funding to several research centers, including the Center for Latin American Studies, the Center for the Study of Democratic Institutions (CSDI), the Robert Penn Warren Center for the Humanities, and the Max Kade Center for European and German Studies.

The most popular majors are economics; medicine, health, and society; political science; neuroscience; and psychology. The college also provides advising for pre-professional tracks, such as pre-med, pre-law, and pre-nursing.

== Student life ==
Student body composition as of May 2, 2023
Race and ethnicity	Total
White	41%
Asian	17%
Black	11%
Other (Note: Other consists of Multiracial Americans & those who prefer to not say.)	11%
Hispanic	11%
Foreign national	9%
Economic diversity
Low-income (Note: The percentage of students who received an income-based federal Pell grant intended for low-income students.)	16%
Affluent (Note: The percentage of students who are a part of the American middle class at the bare minimum.)	84%

=== Residential college system ===
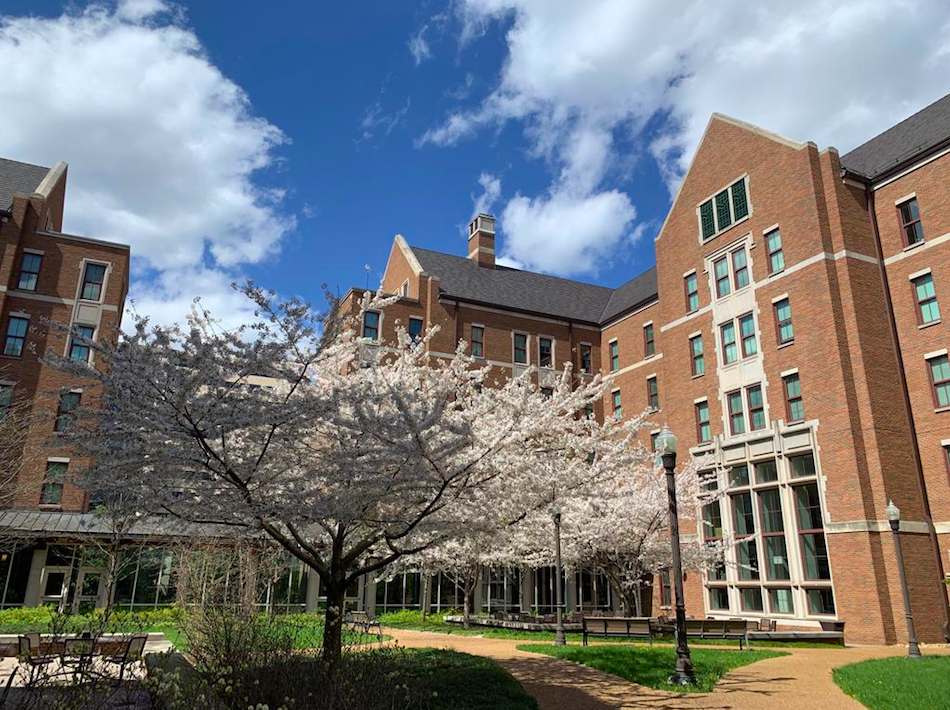
Warren College, which along with Moore College, are known as Kissam

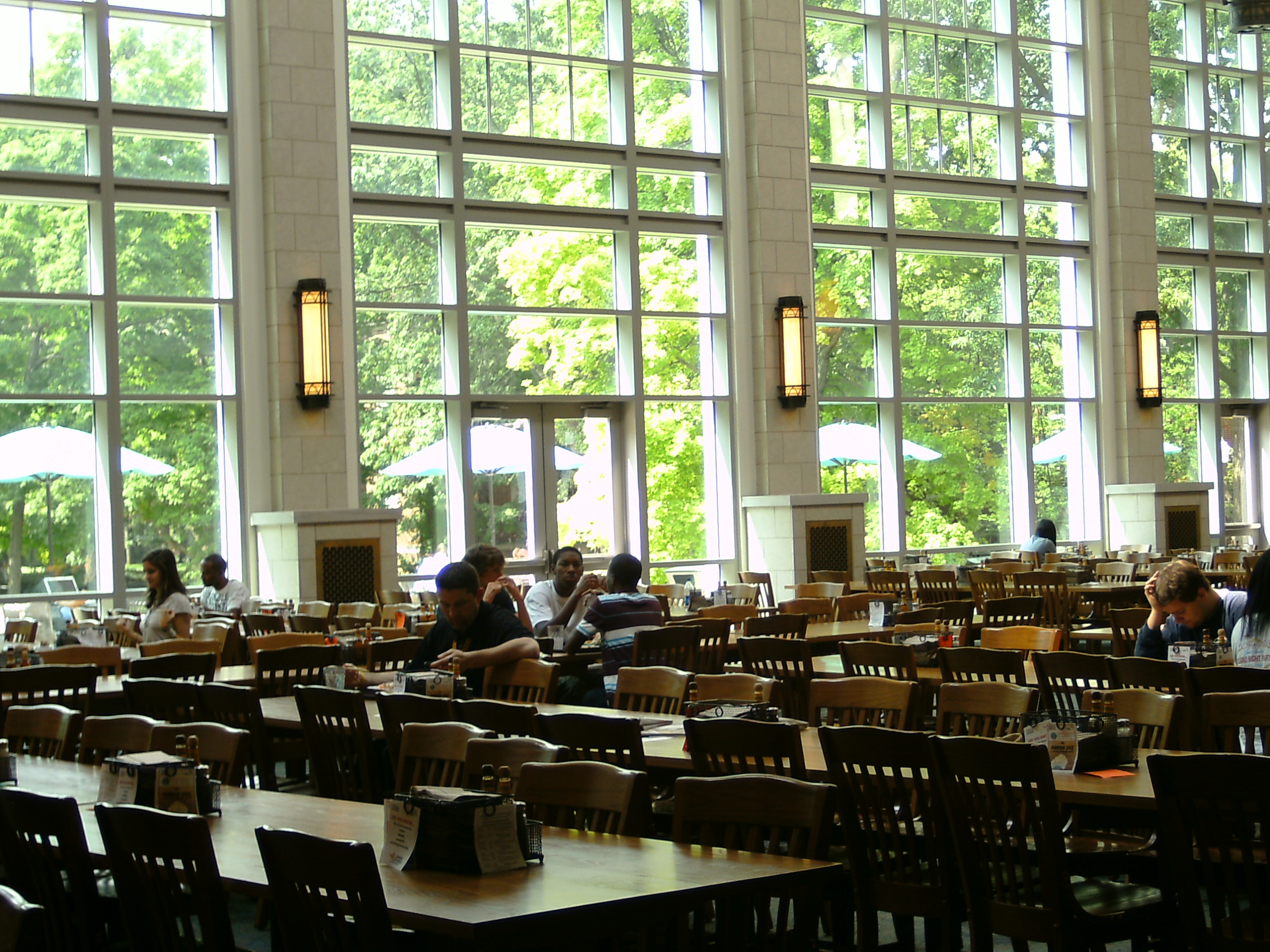
The Commons Center dining hall

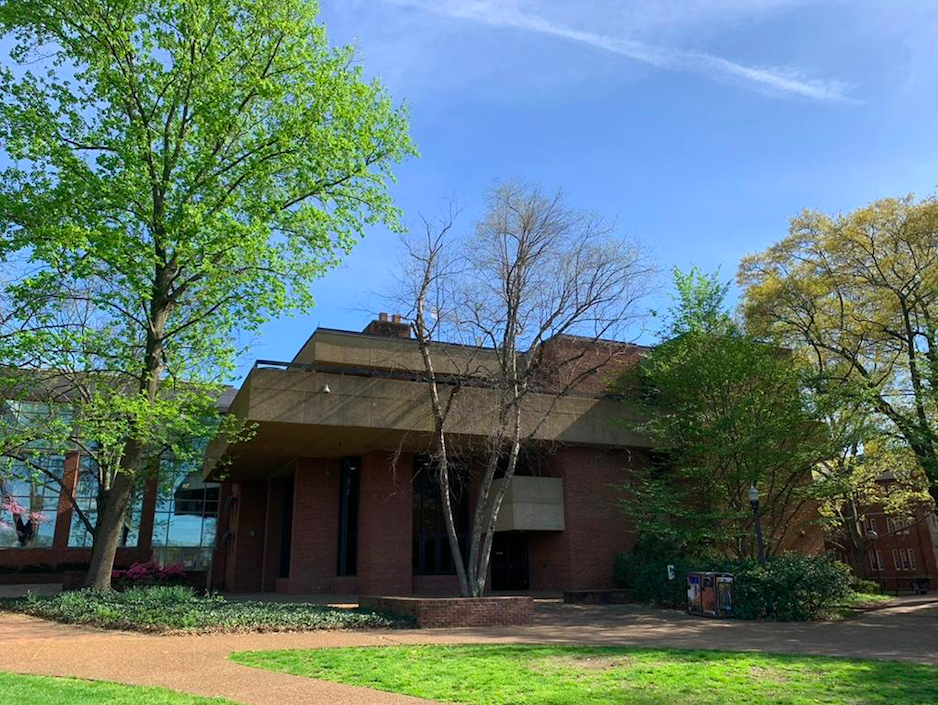
Sarratt Student Center

In the early 2000s, Vanderbilt made a decision to convert its residence halls into an academic residential college system. The intent was to form "a cohesive and growing network of residences that spark creativity, build community, support student success, and extend educational opportunities beyond the classroom."

The first phase of this conversion was the 2008 opening of the Martha Rivers Ingram Commons, which brought together all first-year students in 10 adjacent houses, each guided by a faculty head of house, living among the students in a faculty apartment. It was planned that in their sophomore year, students would enter a Residential College that would be their home for the remainder of their undergraduate years. This residential option expands on the experience provided during students' first year on the Commons. The first two upperclass colleges are Warren College and Moore College, which opened in 2014. They were constructed on the site of pre-existing dormitories known as the Kissam Quadrangle E. Bronson Ingram College, on the site of the former Vanderbilt and Barnard Halls, opened in 2018. Zeppos College, Rothschild College, and Carmichael College opened in 2020, 2022, and 2024, respectively, on the former site of the Carmichael Towers. The new college halls are intended to complement the earlier communities, the McGill Project, Mayfield Lodges, and McTyeire International House.

Two of the new residence halls have received LEED silver certification and the new Commons Dining Center has received gold certification, making Vanderbilt the only university in the state to be recognized by the US Green Building Council. The university expects all five of the new residence halls and one renovated residence hall to eventually receive LEED recognition. The total cost of The Commons construction project is expected to be over $150 million.

Generally, undergraduate students are required to live in dorms on campus, with first-year students all living in the ten resident halls of the Martha Rivers Ingram Commons and all upperclassmen living on the main campus. Exceptions are made for students living with relatives in Davidson County, students with health exemptions, married students, and some students with senior standing.

=== Organizations ===
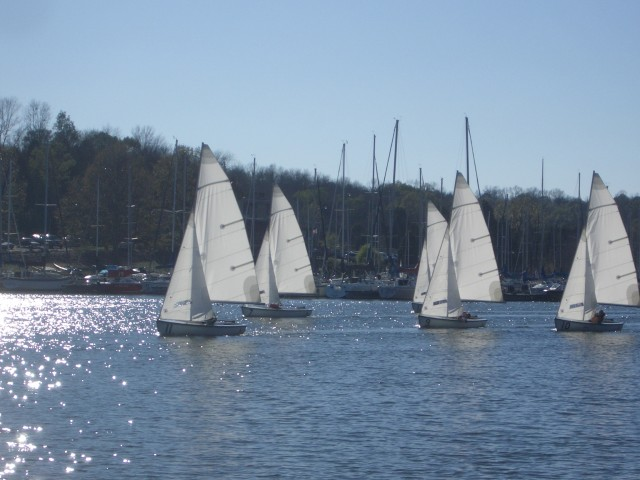
Vanderbilt University Sailing Club at Percy Priest Lake

The university has over 430 student organizations, ranging from academic major societies and honoraries to recreational sports clubs, the oldest of which is the Vanderbilt Sailing Club.

One publication, The Vanderbilt Hustler, was established in 1888 and is the oldest continuously published newspaper in Nashville. In Langford v. Vanderbilt University (1956), a student sued the university for libel; the Tennessee court dismissed the lawsuit, concluding the university was not the owner of the newspaper. Additional student publications include those published by the College of Arts & Science, such as the Vanderbilt Political Review and the Vanderbilt Historical Review, as well as the Vanderbilt University Law School, which publishes three law reviews; the flagship journal is the Vanderbilt Law Review. The on-campus radio station, WRVU, represents the student body by playing a range of music from bluegrass to choral, with a focus on non-mainstream music.

Vanderbilt also has a large performing arts community spanning every genre of the arts with multiple organizations representing each category. There are dance groups covering contemporary, tap, hip hop, Latin, and Bhangra styles as well as numerous theatre, improvisation, spoken word, music and singing groups including the 2014 Sing-Off champion male a cappella group, The Melodores. Performing arts organizations comprise over 1,000 students and are represented by the Vanderbilt Performing Arts Community, which supports groups by sponsoring performances and awards.

The student body is governed by Vanderbilt Student Government, which includes Senate, Judicial, and Executive branches. The organization is responsible for the distribution of nearly $2 million in funds set aside by the university to fund student organizations.

=== Greek life ===
Vanderbilt's Greek system consists of 14 fraternities and 14 sororities. As of the 2021–22 academic year, 20% of men were members of fraternities and 26% of women were members of sororities, or 23% of total undergraduates were actively involved in the Greek system.

=== Student controversies ===
In 1980, several Vanderbilt students, one of whom was African-American, decided to hold Nat Turner Day to protest Kappa Alpha Order's celebration of Old South Day, when KA brothers dressed as Confederate States Army personnel. The university administrators sided with KA, banned Nat Turner Day, and let KA parade in their Confederate costumes. The African-American student was called a homophobic slur and beaten up by the KA chapter.

On November 4, 2010, two anonymous former members of the Vanderbilt chapter, an alumnus and a senior student, alleged they were evicted from Beta Upsilon Chi, a Christian fraternity, for being gay.

In the wake of a US Supreme Court decision in 2011, four Christian student organizations were placed on probation due to non-compliance with the university's nondiscrimination policy, which requires student groups to accept all students and forbids them from requiring that their officers share the "beliefs, goals and values" embodied in the group. Controversy continued to surround this issue throughout 2011 and 2012, culminating in a proposed state law exempting student organizations from nondiscrimination policies. Although the bill passed both houses of the Tennessee Legislature, it was vetoed by Governor Bill Haslam.

In March 2015, three swastikas, a symbol of Nazi antisemitism, were found spray-painted in the elevator and basement inside the house of Alpha Epsilon Pi, one of the historically Jewish fraternities on campus. The campus Hillel chapter called it "a malicious attack intended to bring to mind the horrors of the Holocaust, to force us to feel different, endangered and isolated." The news, characterized as a "hate crime" by university officials, made national and international headlines, including in Israel.

A 2015 survey reported that 20% of undergraduate students were sexually assaulted in 2014–2015. Meanwhile, as of 2015, The Tennessean reports that the university is "under review by federal education officials, spurred by six current and former female students who filed a complaint about how Vanderbilt has handled cases of sexual misconduct."

In April 2016 and June 2016, two former Vanderbilt football players were found guilty of charges related to the videotaped rape of an unconscious woman in a dorm room. Cory Batey was convicted of aggravated rape, aggravated sexual battery, facilitation of aggravated rape, and attempted aggravated rape, while Brandon Vandenburg was convicted of aggravated rape, aggravated sexual battery, and unlawful photography. The two are among four former football players charged with crimes related to the case.

In July 2020, a white fraternity brother from Delta Kappa Epsilon was caught on video utilizing a racial slur along with white Kappa Alpha Theta sisters, wearing what appeared to be mock durags. Hundreds of students dropped out of their fraternities and sororities, writing op-eds condemning their own fraternities and sororities for the student newspaper, The Vanderbilt Hustler. The controversy surrounding this sparked a national "Abolish Greek Life" movement at multiple other universities, including but not limited to the University of Richmond, Duke University, Emory University, American University, Northwestern University, and the University of North Carolina at Chapel Hill.

In February 2021, the university released a statement regarding the death of a construction worker at the Rothschild College construction site. Additionally, the university confirmed in February 2023 to The Vanderbilt Hustler that there had been another on-campus construction death in July 2021 at the Owen Graduate School of Management. The university stated that the deaths were of natural causes and not work-site related. Students have since organized the "Dores Worker Solidarity Network", which aims to improve construction practices in Nashville amid worker deaths and wage disputes on campus.

In 2024, university administrators blocked the Vanderbilt Student Government from voting on a Boycott, Divestment and Sanctions resolution following Israeli invasion of Gaza. Students protested with sit-ins, including a protest in which the university expelled three, suspended one, placed 22 students on disciplinary probation. The university police department arrested a Nashville Scene reporter, who was released just hours later after a judge found no probable cause for his arrest; the Nashville district attorney stated that he would not charge a reporter for doing their job.

== Athletics ==
Vanderbilt Commodores logo

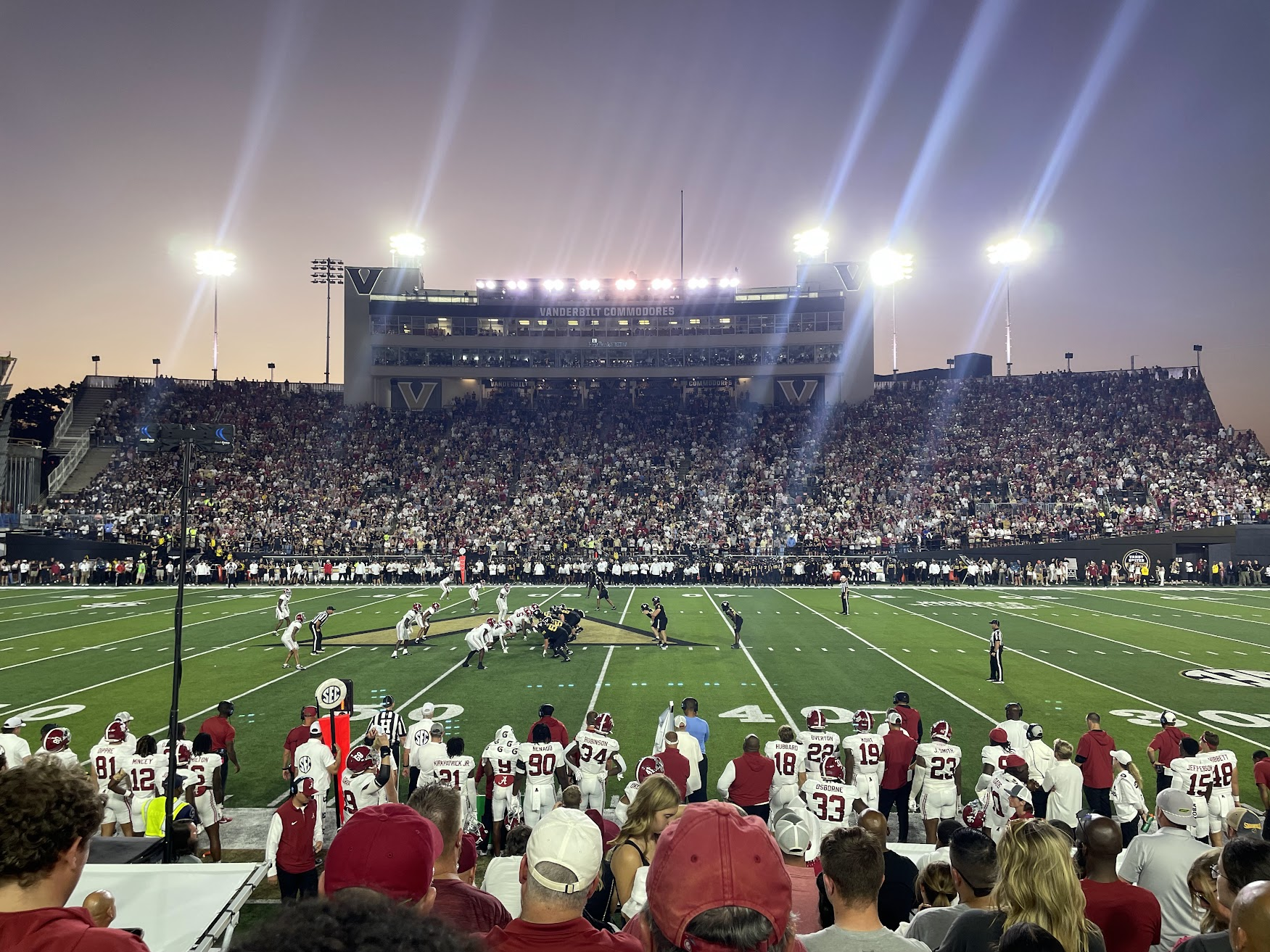
FirstBank Stadium in 2024 during the historic upset win against Alabama

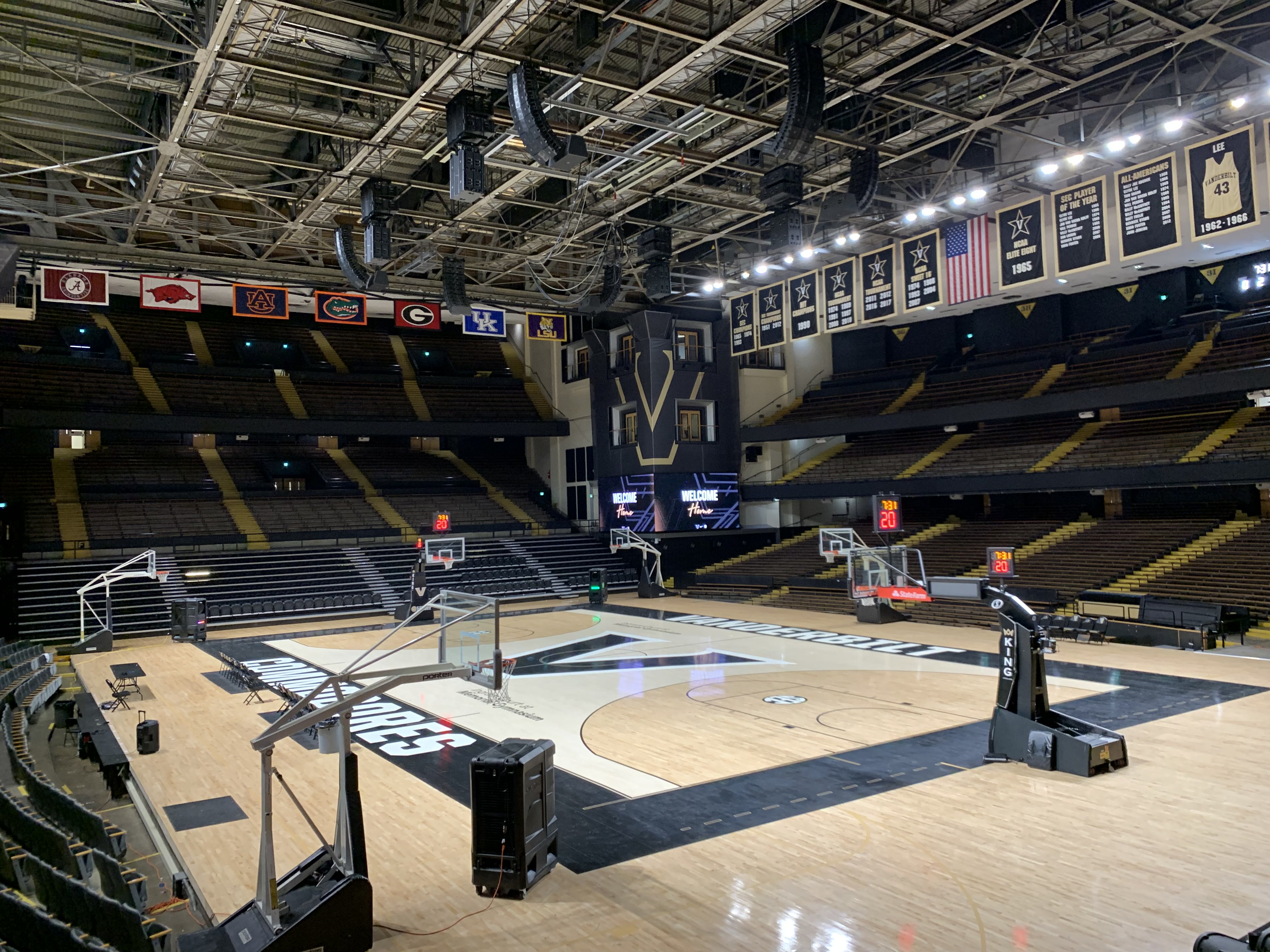
Memorial Gymnasium in 2023

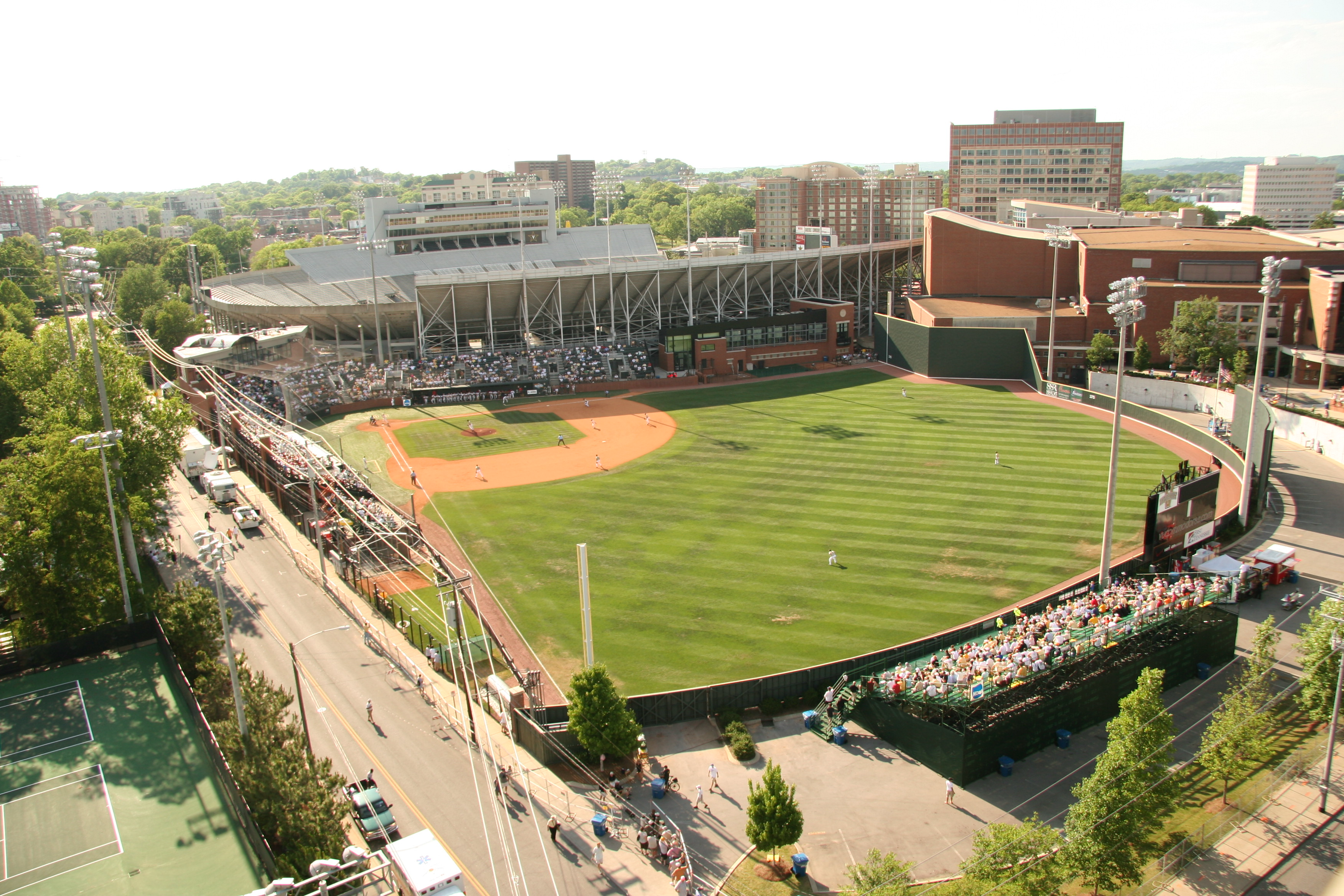
Hawkins Field in June 2007

Vanderbilt is a founding member of the Southeastern Conference and for a half-century has been the conference's only private school. The university fields six men's and ten women's intercollegiate teams and has won six NCAA championships. With about 7,000 undergraduates, the school is also the smallest in the conference; the SEC's next-smallest school, Mississippi State University, has nearly twice as many undergraduate students. Additionally, the school has outside conference memberships in two women's sports that the SEC does not sponsor. The women's lacrosse team plays in the American Athletic Conference. In bowling, a sport which the NCAA sanctions only for women, Vanderbilt is a member of Conference USA. Conversely, Vanderbilt is the only SEC school not to field teams in softball and volleyball, though the university plans to reintroduce the latter during the 2025–26 academic year.

Both basketball teams play in Memorial Gym, built in 1952. Vanderbilt's home court advantage has been nicknamed "Memorial Magic".

=== Athletics restructuring ===
The university is unique in NCAA Division I in that for several years the athletics department was not administered separately from other aspects of campus life; Vice Chancellor David Williams, who was over intercollegiate athletics, also was university counsel and in charge of other aspects of undergraduate campus life such as intramural sports. Despite fears that Vanderbilt would lose coaches and recruits or would be forced out of the SEC, the university experienced considerable success after the change; 2006–07 was one of the best in the school's athletic history. At one point, seven of Vanderbilt's 16 teams were concurrently ranked in the Top 25 of their respective sports. Women's bowling won the NCAA championship, bringing the university its first team championship since the advent of the NCAA. The baseball team qualified for the NCAA Super Regionals in 2004, had the nation's top recruiting class in 2005 according to Baseball America, made the NCAA field again in 2006, and won the 2007 SEC regular-season and tournament championships. Vanderbilt was ranked first in most polls for a large portion of the 2007 season, and the team secured the top seed in the 2007 NCAA tournament. In more recent years, the team has reached the pinnacle of college baseball winning the College World Series in both 2014 and 2019. The team's triumph in 2014 was the school's first national championship in a men's sport.

=== Mascot ===
Vanderbilt's intercollegiate athletics teams are nicknamed the Commodores, in honor of the nickname given to Cornelius Vanderbilt, who made his fortune in shipping. The term commodore was used by the Navy during the mid-to-late 19th century. A commodore was the commanding officer of a task force of ships, and therefore higher in rank than a captain but lower in rank than an admiral. The rank is still used by the British Royal Navy and other Commonwealth countries, but the equivalent modern-day rank in the US Navy is rear admiral lower half. Since the term was used most during the 19th century, Vanderbilt's mascot, "Mr. C", is usually portrayed as a naval officer from the late 19th century, complete with mutton chops, cutlass, and uniform.

In addition to Mr. C, Vanderbilt fans often use the cheer "Anchor down!" accompanied by the "VU" hand sign, created by extending the thumb along with the index and middle fingers (essentially identical to the Serbian three-finger salute).

Varsity sports
Men's	Women's
Baseball	Basketball
Basketball	Bowling
Cross country	Cross country
Football	Golf
Golf	Lacrosse
Tennis	Soccer
	Swimming
	Spirit - cheer and dance
	Tennis
	Track and field
	Volleyball

== Notable people ==
=== Alumni ===
Notable Vanderbilt alumni include:

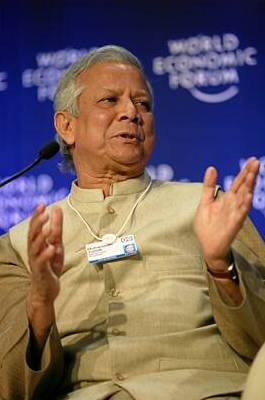
Nobel Peace Prize-winning social entrepreneur Muhammad Yunus (PhD, 1971)

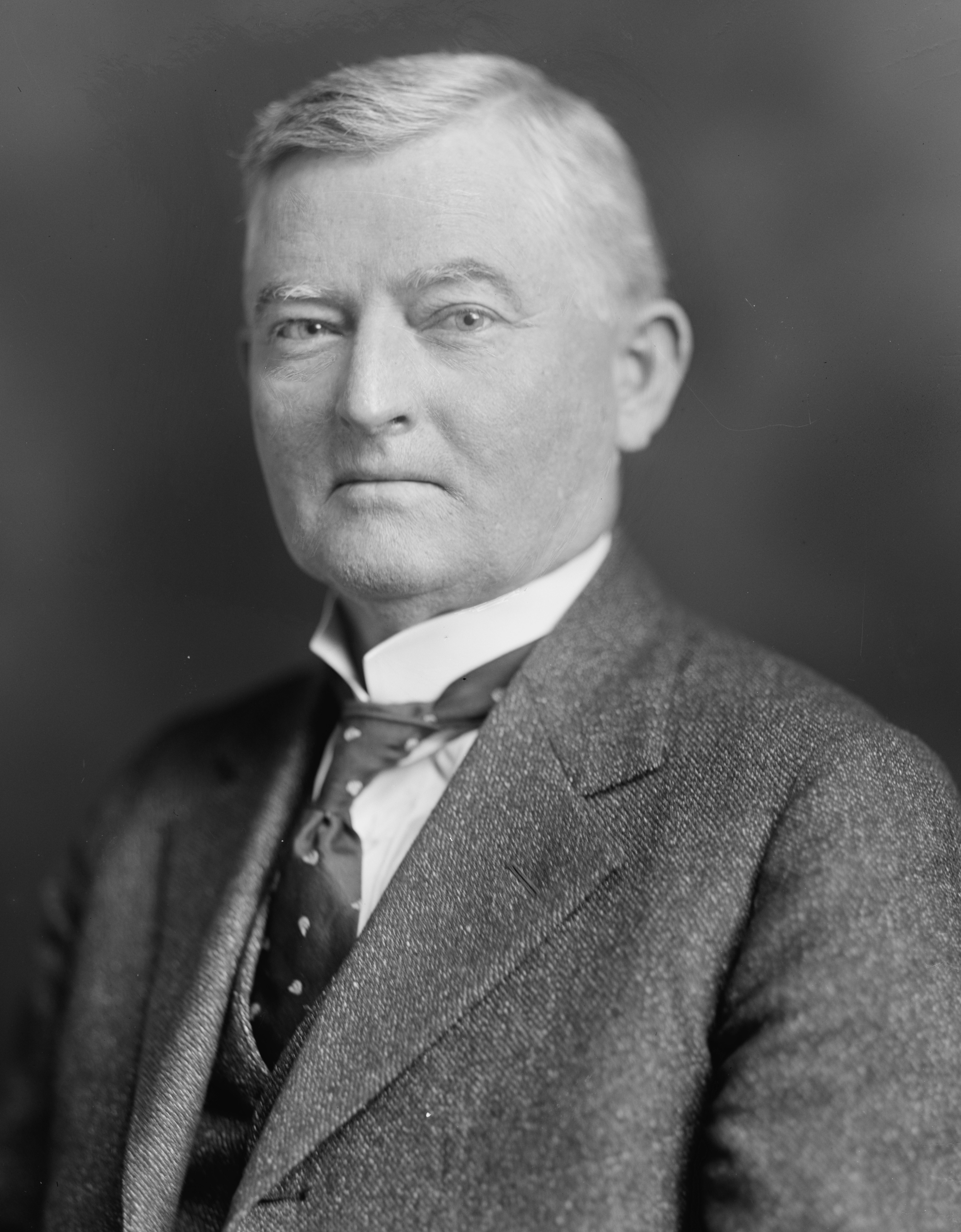
32nd Vice President of the United States John Nance Garner (Law, 1886)

45th Vice President of the United States and Nobel Peace Prize laureate Al Gore (Div, 1971–72) (Note: No degree earned.)

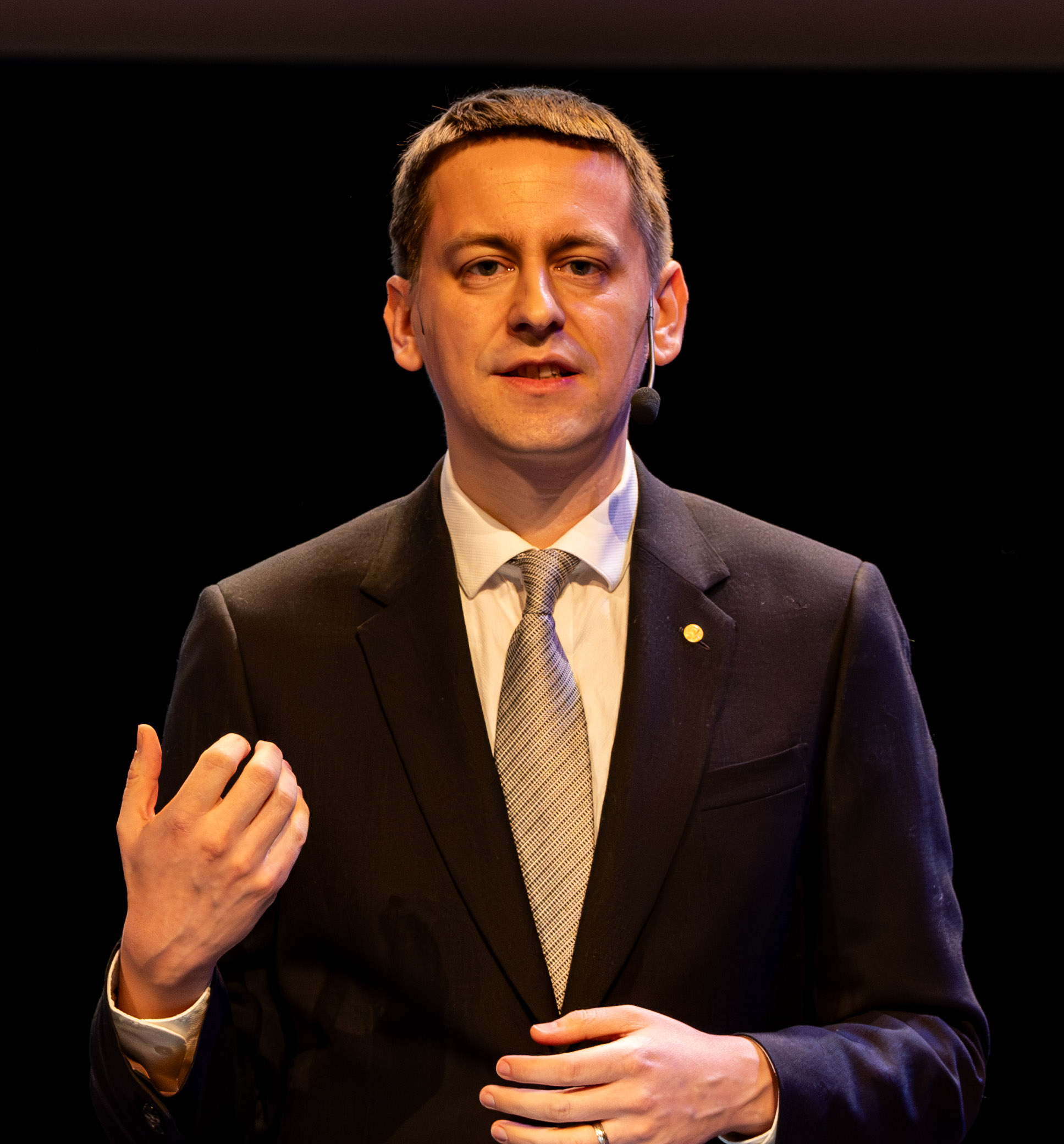
Nobel Prize laureate and creator of AlphaFold John Jumper (BS, 2007)

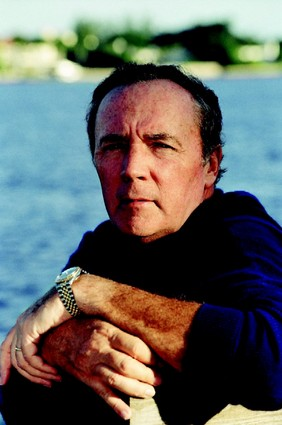
Author James Patterson (MA, 1970)

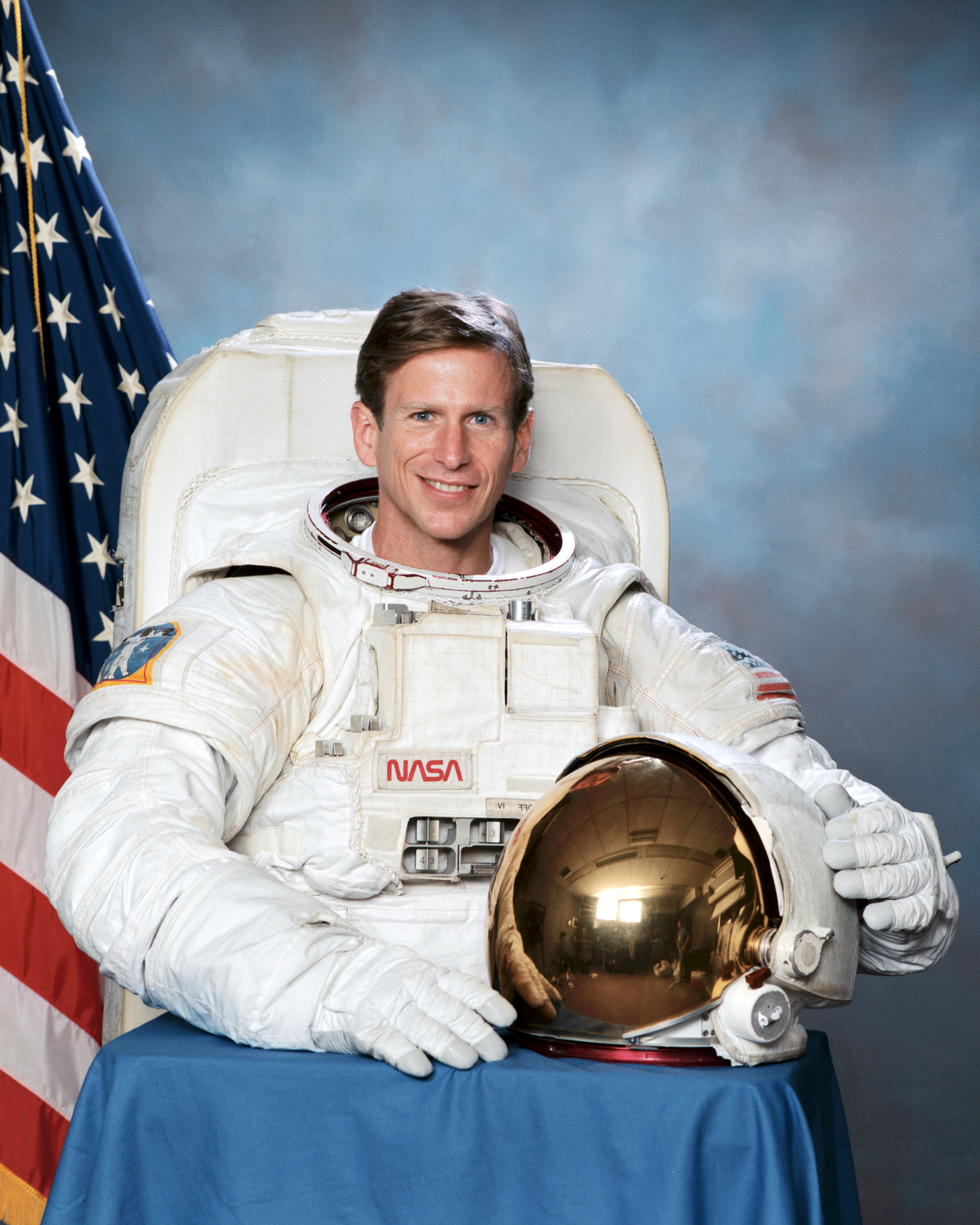
NASA astronaut Michael L. Gernhardt (BS, 1978)

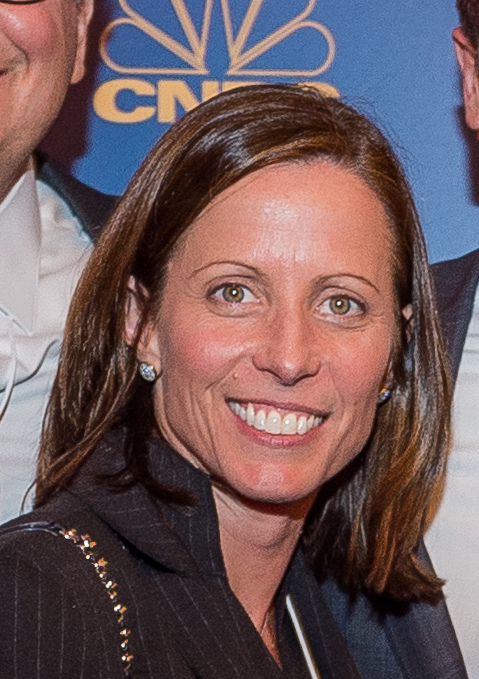
President and CEO of Nasdaq, Inc. Adena Friedman (MBA, 1993)

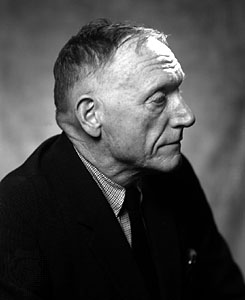
Pulitzer Prize-winning author of All the King's Men Robert Penn Warren (BA, 1925)

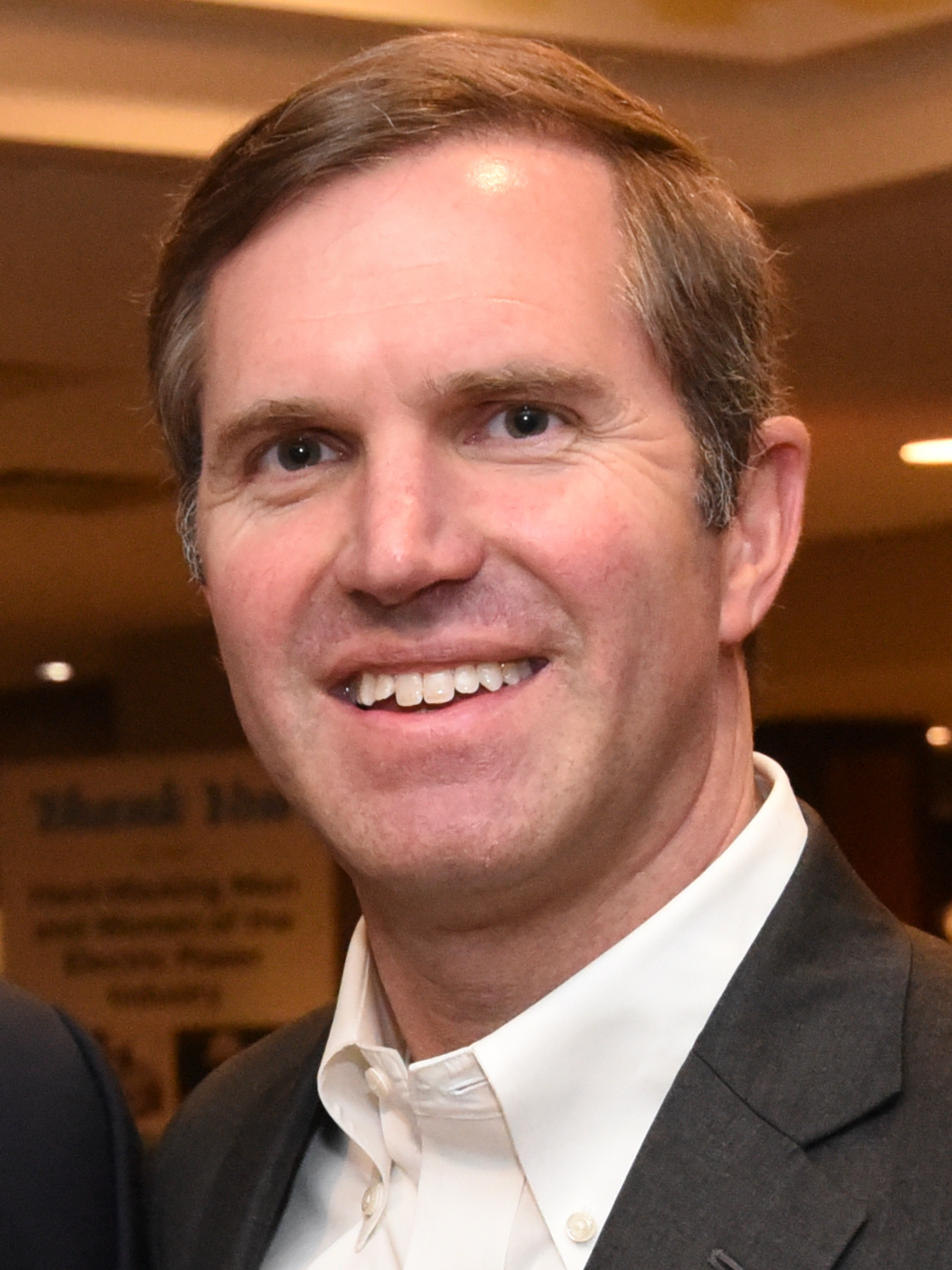
63rd Governor of Kentucky Andy Beshear (BA, 2000)

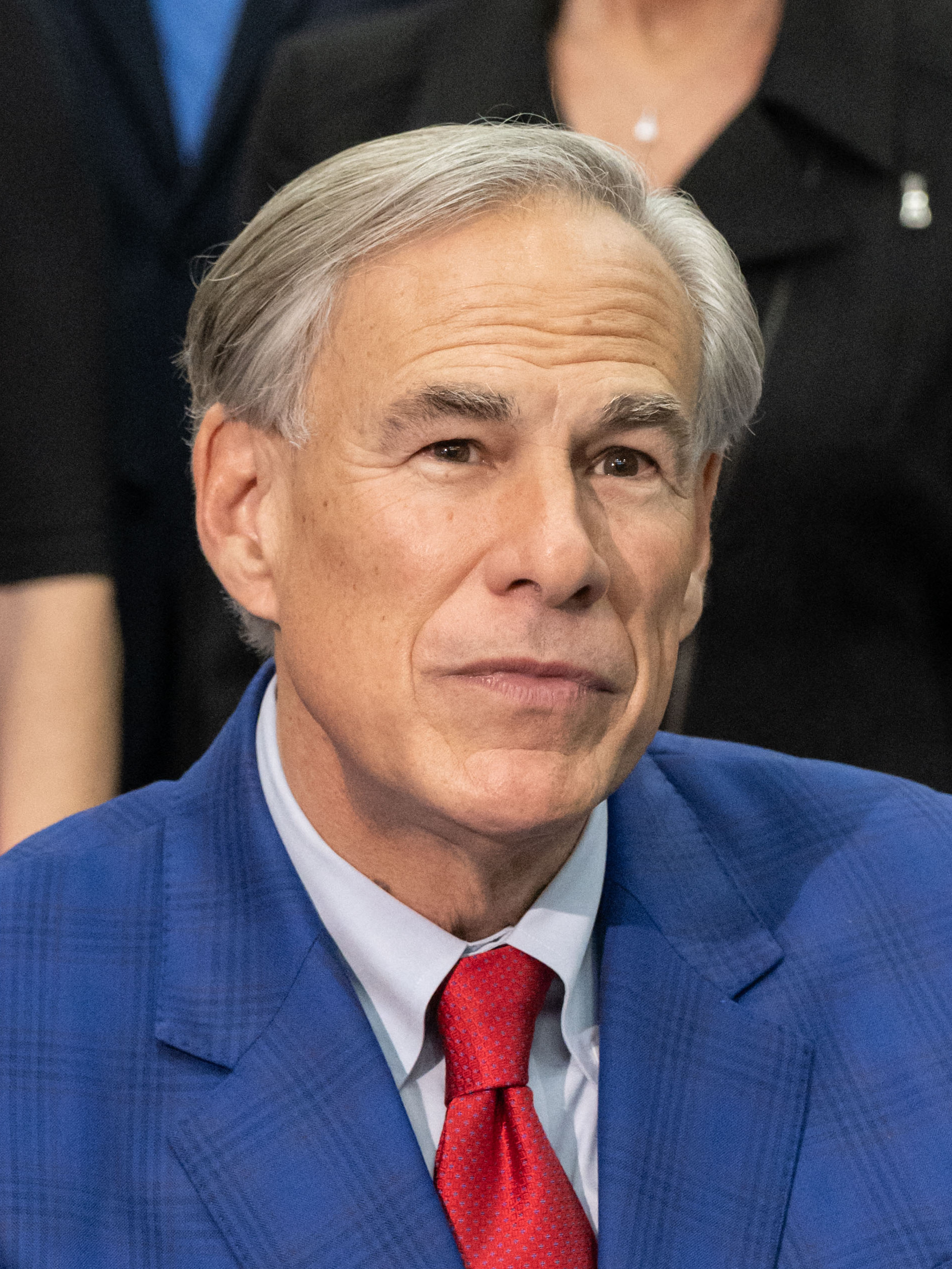
48th Governor of Texas Greg Abbott (JD, 1984)

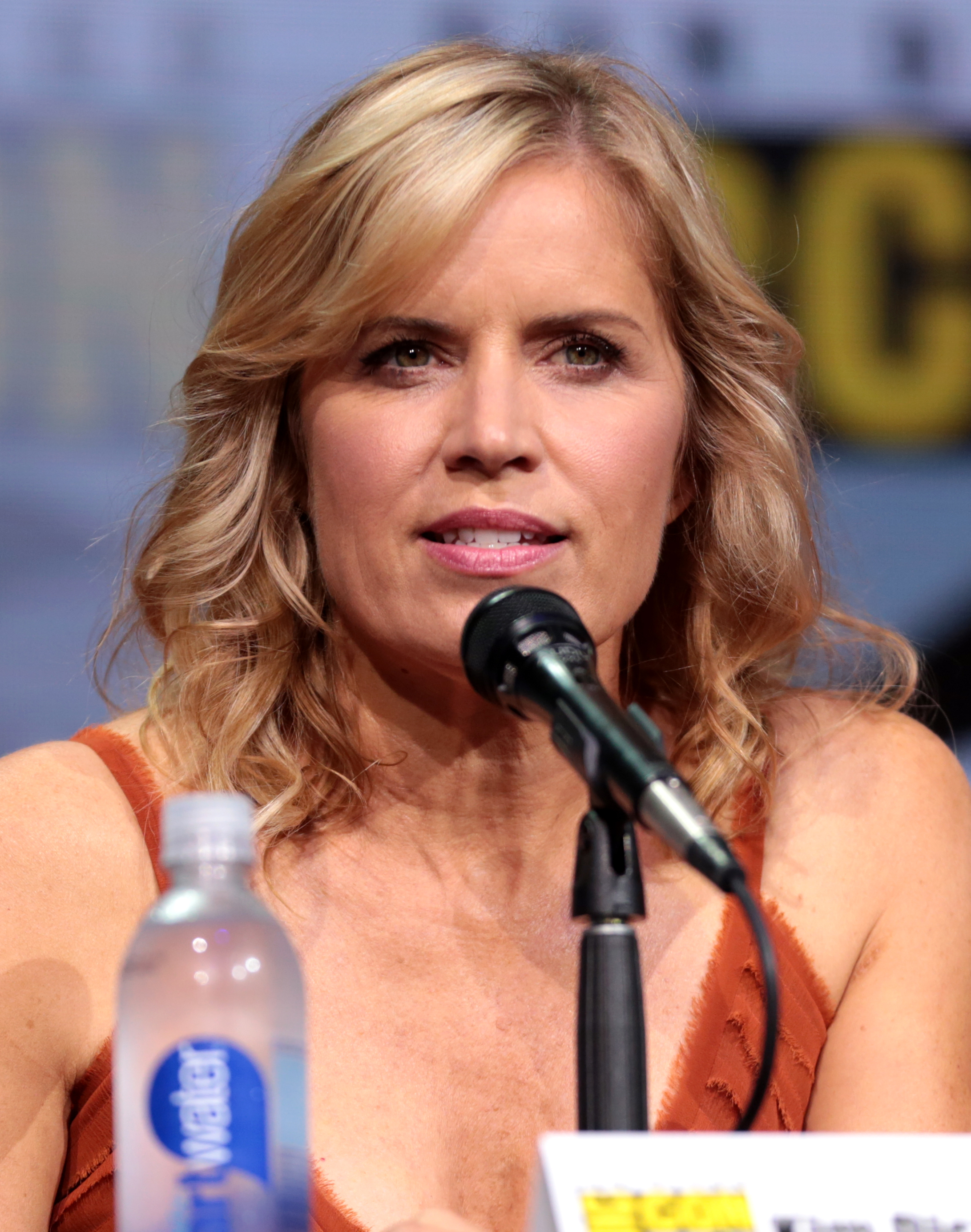
Actress Kim Dickens (BA, 1987)

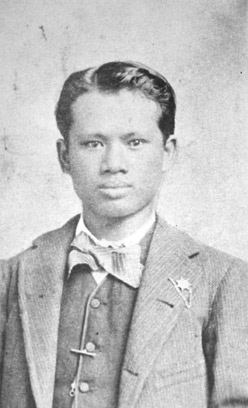
Chinese businessman and patriarch of the Soong family Charlie Soong (Div, 1885)

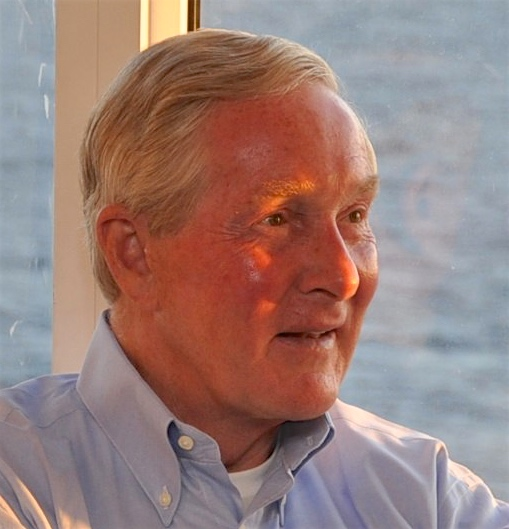
Billionaire physician and entrepreneur Thomas F. Frist Jr. (BA, 1961)

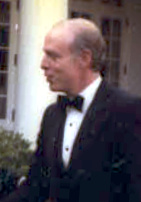
Founder of Bain & Company Bill Bain (BA, 1959)

Alumni who have served as heads of state, prime ministers, and heads of government include José Ramón Guizado, 17th President of Panama, Thomas C. Jefferson, first Premier of the Cayman Islands, Abdiweli Mohamed Ali, 15th Prime Minister of Somalia, and Chung Won-shik, 21st Prime Minister of South Korea.

Notable US political figures who have attended Vanderbilt include two US Vice Presidents (John Nance Garner and Nobel Laureate Al Gore), Supreme Court Justice and US Attorney General James Clark McReynolds US Secretary of Commerce Mickey Kantor, Director of the National Economic Council Allan B. Hubbard, US Commissioner of Education John J. Tigert, US Secretary of the Treasury John Wesley Snyder, US Secretary of Education Lamar Alexander, two White House Chiefs of Staff, John R. Steelman and Jack Watson, as well as 53 members of the United States Congress, 18 ambassadors, and 13 governors, including Governor of Texas Greg Abbott and Governor of Kentucky Andy Beshear.

Other leaders in foreign government who graduated from Vanderbilt include Baso Sangqu, President of the United Nations Security Council; Redley A. Killion, Vice President of Micronesia; Pedro Pinto Rubianes, Vice President of Ecuador; Yoo Myung-hee, Minister for Trade of South Korea, Yeda Crusius, Governor of the Brazilian state of Rio Grande do Sul; Wang Tso-jung, President of the Control Yuan of the Government of the Republic of China; Soemarno Sosroatmodjo, Governor of Jakarta, Indonesia; Kwon Hyouk-se, Governor of the Financial Supervisory Service of South Korea; and Ihor Petrashko, Minister of Economic Development and Trade of Ukraine.

Influential figures outside of elected office include civil rights movement pioneer James Lawson, Nobel Peace Prize-winning father of microfinance Muhammad Yunus, Scopes Trial chief counsel John Randolph Neal Jr., Chinese theologian T. C. Chao, Watergate prosecutor James F. Neal, Yun Chi-ho, Korean political activist and thinker during the Joseon Dynasty, and Charlie Soong, who played a significant role in the Xinhai Revolution.

Prominent alumni in business and finance include Time Inc. Chairman and CEO Ann S. Moore, American Airlines Group CEO Doug Parker, Hilton Hotels CEO Matthew J. Hart, NASDAQ CEO Adena Friedman, J.P. Morgan & Co. CEO Henry C. Alexander, American Express Chairman Ralph Owen, founding engineer of Facebook Jeffrey J. Rothschild, General Motors President Mark Reuss, Bain and Company founder Bill Bain, Boston Consulting Group founder Bruce Henderson, Perot Systems Chairman Ross Perot Jr., Dollar General CEO Cal Turner Jr., iHeartMedia CEO Mark P. Mays, Emerson Electric CEO David Farr, Eastman Kodak President William S. Vaughn, and Sotheby's CEO Michael Ainslie. In addition, Vanderbilt has educated several heads of central banks, including Süreyya Serdengeçti (Central Bank of Turkey); Syahril Sabirin (Bank of Indonesia); Moshe Mendelbaum (Bank of Israel); Ibrahim Eris (Central Bank of Brazil); and Liang Kuo-shu (Central Bank of the Republic of China).

In academia and the sciences, distinguished Vanderbilt alumni include University of Pennsylvania president Sheldon Hackney, founding dean of Harvard University's John F. Kennedy School of Government Don K. Price, Nobel Prize in Chemistry winner Stanford Moore, astronomers E. E. Barnard and J. Davy Kirkpatrick, Platonist philosopher Richard M. Weaver, founder of New Criticism Cleanth Brooks, mathematician Lawrence C. Evans, Index of Sustainable Economic Welfare developer Herman Daly, Haskell programming language designer Paul Hudak, Director of the Simons Center for the Social Brain at MIT Mriganka Sur, founder of the NASA Astrobiology Institute and Chairman of the SpaceX Safety Advisory Panel G. Scott Hubbard, Mendel L. Peterson, "the father of underwater archaeology", John Ridley Stroop, who discovered the Stroop effect, and NASA astronauts Michael L. Gernhardt and Charles R. Chappell.

Vanderbilt graduates in medicine have pioneered and attained several "firsts" within their fields, including Norman Shumway, first to perform a successful heart transplant in the United States, Levi Watkins, first to successfully implant an automatic defibrillator in a human patient, Mildred T. Stahlman, founder of the first NICU, James Tayloe Gwathmey, the "Father of Modern Anesthesia," and Ernest William Goodpasture, who invented methods for growing viruses and rickettsiae, enabling the development of vaccination.

Alumni have made significant contributions to literature. Most notably, the Southern Agrarians and Fugitive Poets were two overlapping groups of influential American poets and writers in the early 1900s based at Vanderbilt. Three US Poets Laureate are alums: Allen Tate, Robert Penn Warren, and Randall Jarrell. Warren later won the Pulitzer Prize twice for poetry and for All the King's Men. Other important novelists include James Dickey (Deliverance), James Still (River of Earth), Elizabeth Spencer (The Light in the Piazza), and James Patterson, who topped Forbes's list of global highest grossing authors in multiple years. Journalists who have attended Vanderbilt include Pulitzer Prize winners Ralph McGill and Wendell Rawls Jr., Morning Joe host Willie Geist, Vogue Director of Communications Hildy Kuryk, NBC newscaster David Brinkley, CNN International anchor Richard Quest, and head writer of The Daily Show Zhubin Parang.

In popular culture, Dinah Shore, James Melton, Rosanne Cash, Amy Grant, Kim Dickens, Logan Browning, Dierks Bentley, Joe Bob Briggs, and film directors Rod Daniel and BAFTA winner Duncan Jones, Skip Bayless all attended Vanderbilt, as well as Academy Award winners Delbert Mann and Tom Schulman.

Additionally, Vanderbilt counts among its alumni base current and former athletes in the NFL, MLB, and NBA, as well as on the PGA Tour. Alumni in the NFL include Jay Cutler, Bill Wade, Casey Hayward, Ke'Shawn Vaughn, and Trent Sherfield. Vanderbilt's entrants into the NBA include Will Perdue, Charles Davis, Festus Ezeli, Darius Garland, Dan Langhi, Clyde Lee, Luke Kornet, and Aaron Nesmith. Vanderbilt baseball stars include Sonny Gray, Walker Buehler, Pedro Alvarez, Dansby Swanson, David Price, Scotti Madison, and Mike Minor. Carter Hawkins, general manager of the Chicago Cubs, played baseball at Vanderbilt from 2004 to 2007. Brandt Snedeker was the PGA Tour Rookie of the Year in 2007. Olympians who attended Vanderbilt include Jeff Turner, member of the gold medal-winning 1984 United States men's Olympic basketball team, gold medalist Shannon Vreeland in the 4×200-meter freestyle relay at the 2012 Summer Olympics, and rower Peter Sharis in the men's coxless pair event at the 1992 Summer Olympics.

=== Faculty ===
Notable past and present Vanderbilt faculty include:

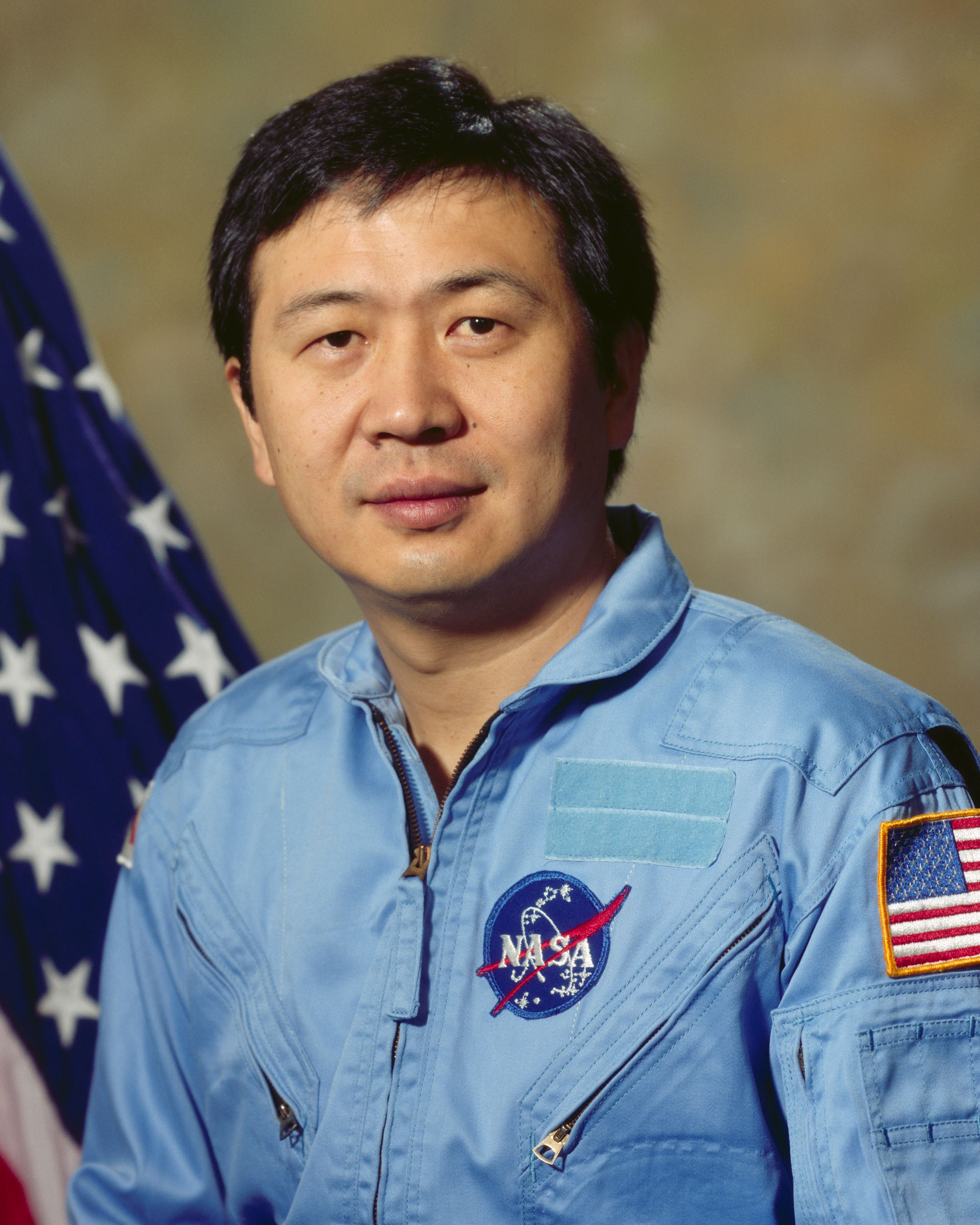
NASA astronaut Taylor Wang

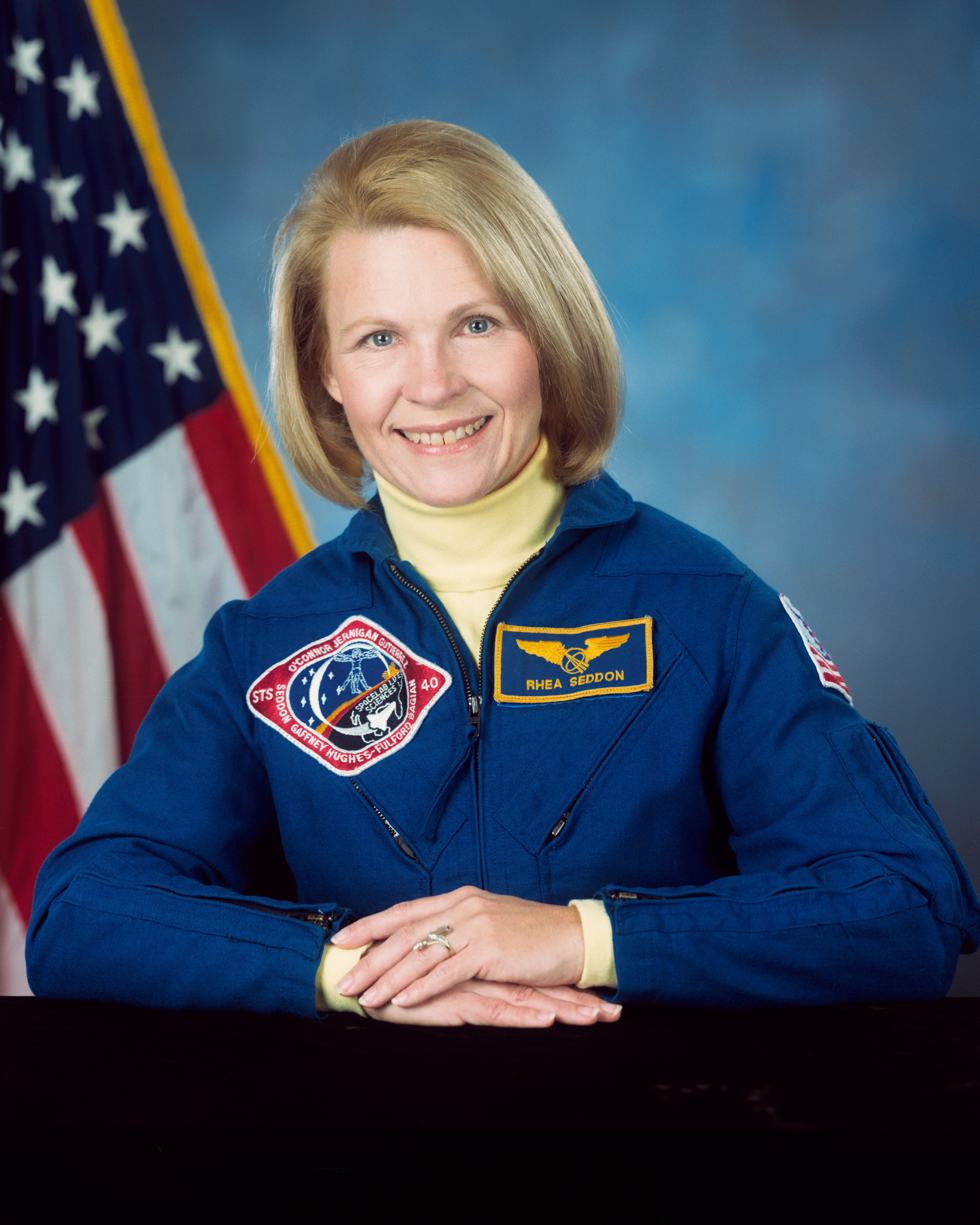
NASA astronaut Rhea Seddon

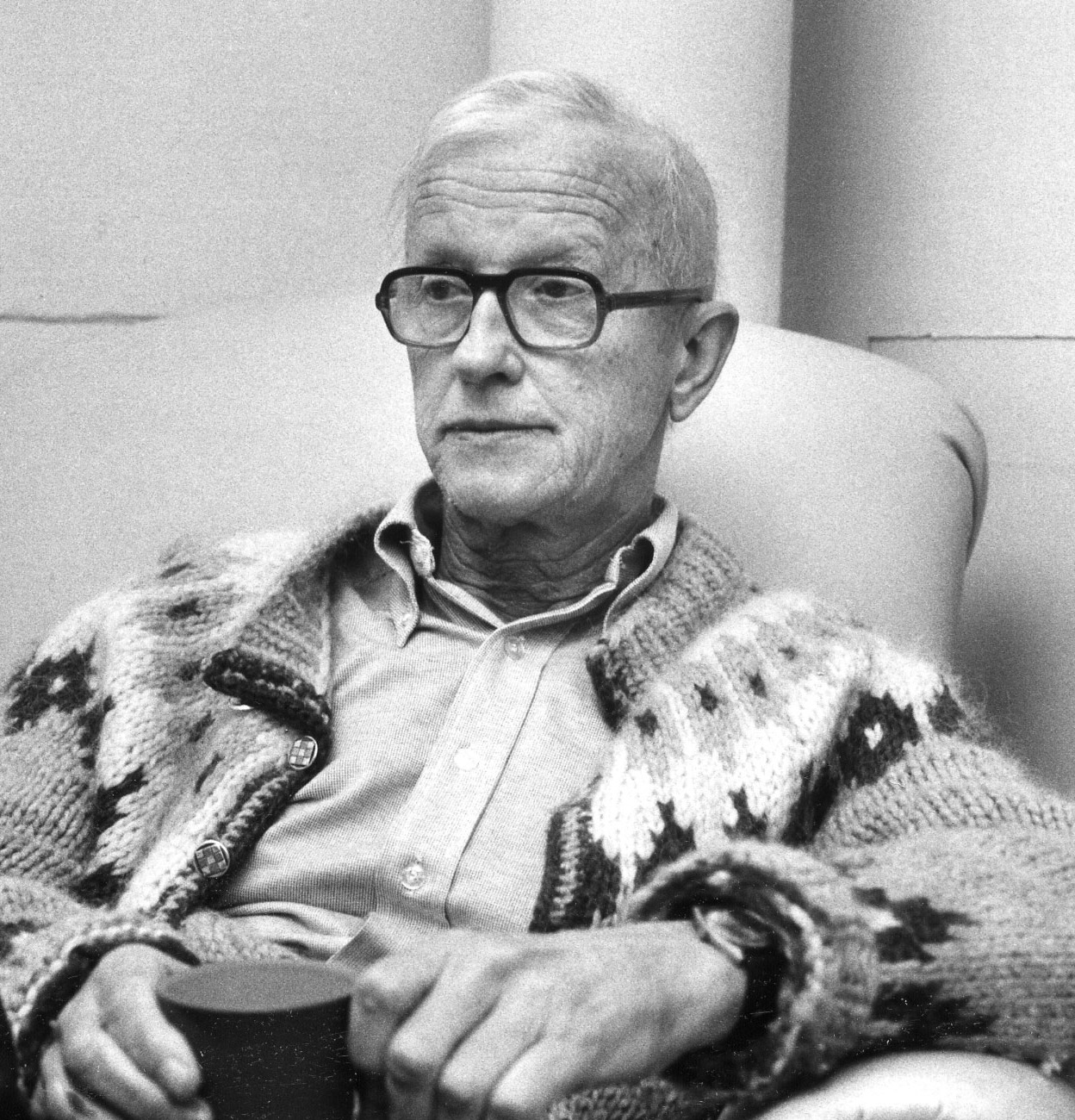
Biophysicist and Nobel Prize laureate Max Delbrück

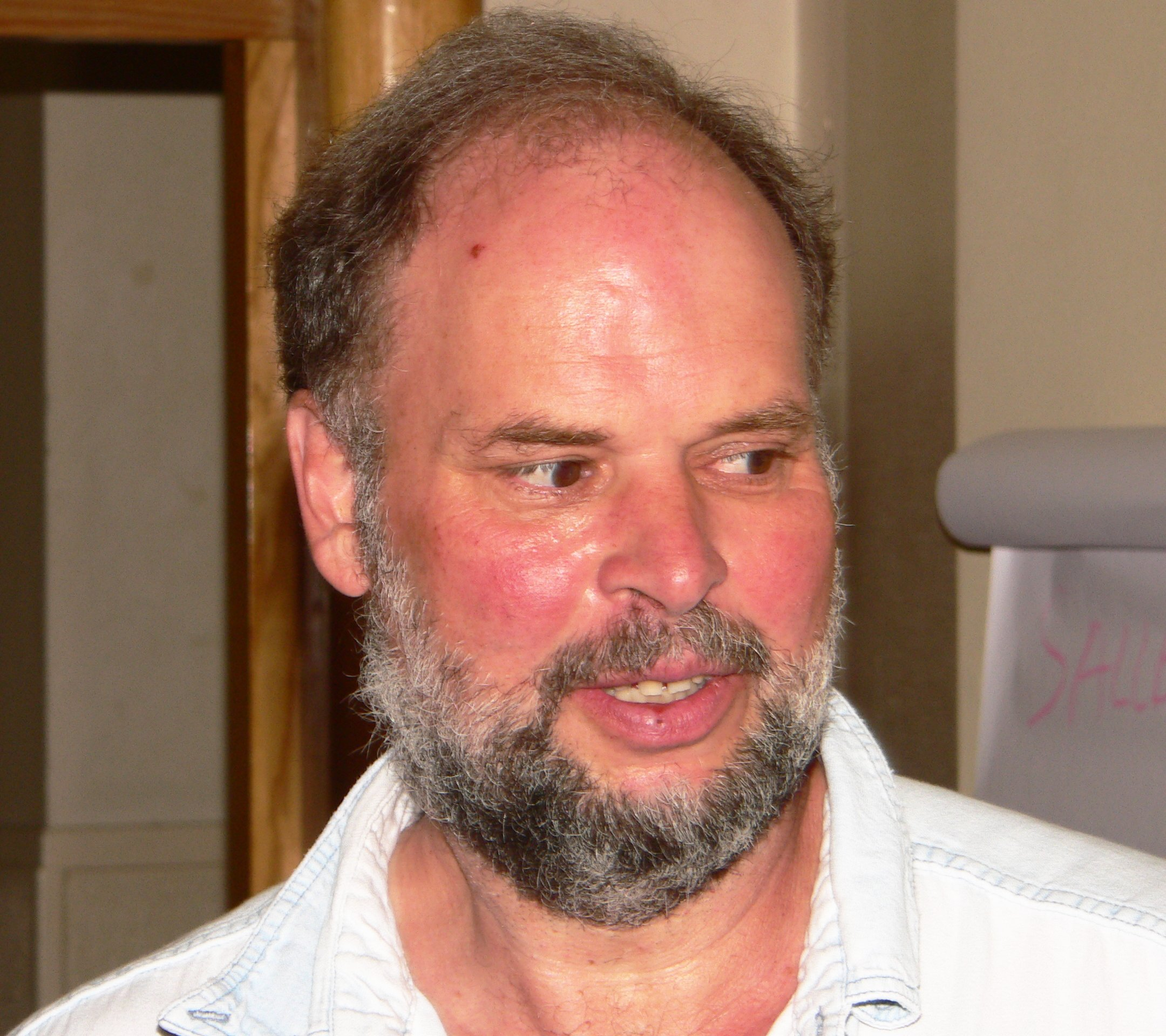
New Zealand mathematician and Fields medalist Vaughan Jones

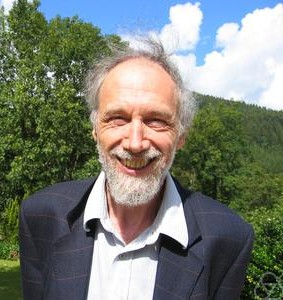
French mathematician and Fields medalist Alain Connes

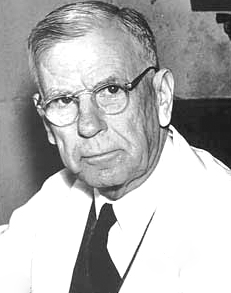
Pathologist and physician Ernest Goodpasture

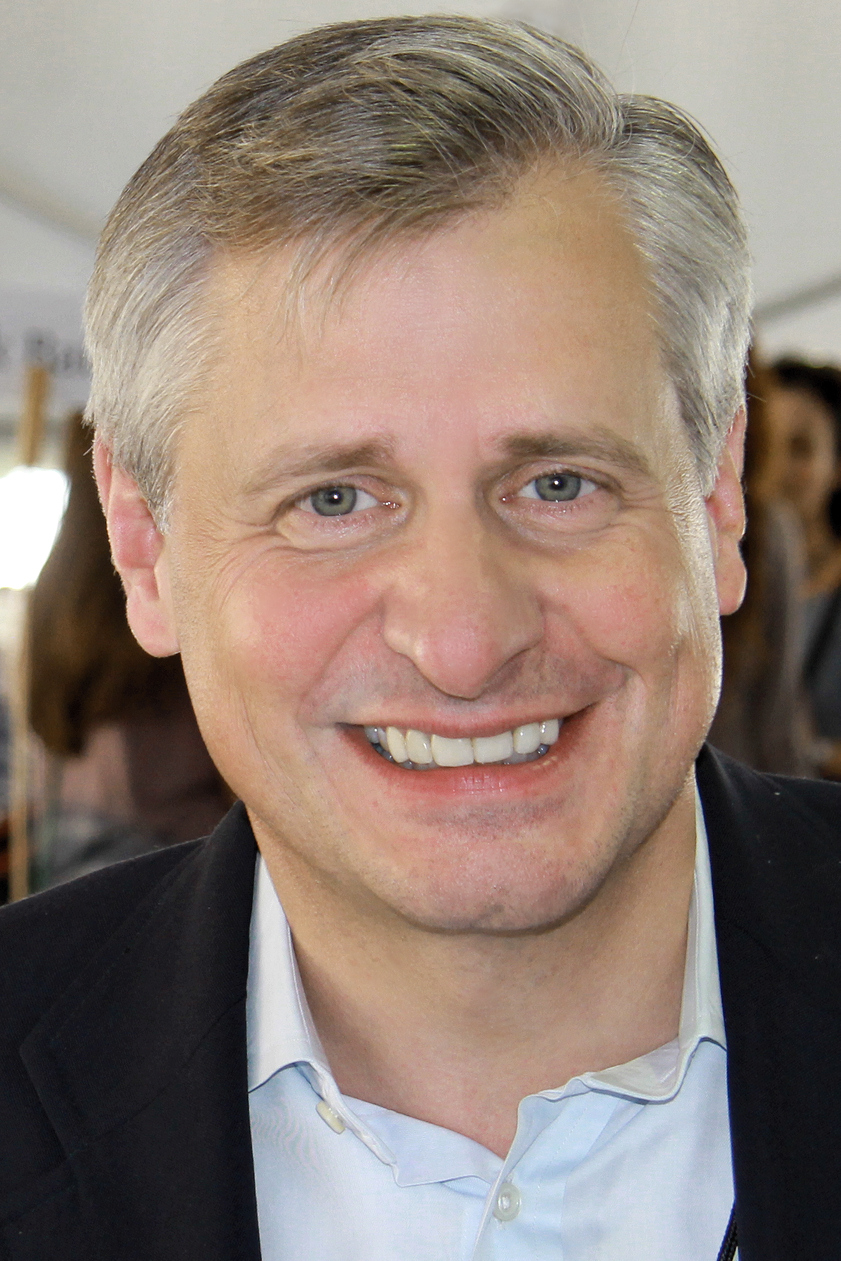
Pulitzer Prize-winning author of American Lion Jon Meacham

== See also ==
- Latin American Public Opinion Project
- Southern Ivy
