= Branscomb =

Branscomb may refer to:

== Locations ==
- Branscomb, California
- Branscomb Glacier

== Surname ==
- Harvie Branscomb (1894–1998), American university administrator
- John Warren Branscomb (1905–1959), American Bishop of the Methodist Church
- Lewis C. Branscomb (1865-1930), American Methodist minister and temperance leader
- Lewis M. Branscomb (1926–2023), American physicist
- Louise Branscomb (1901–1999), American physician

== See also ==
- Branscombe (disambiguation)
