= Kirkland Hall =

Building at Vanderbilt University

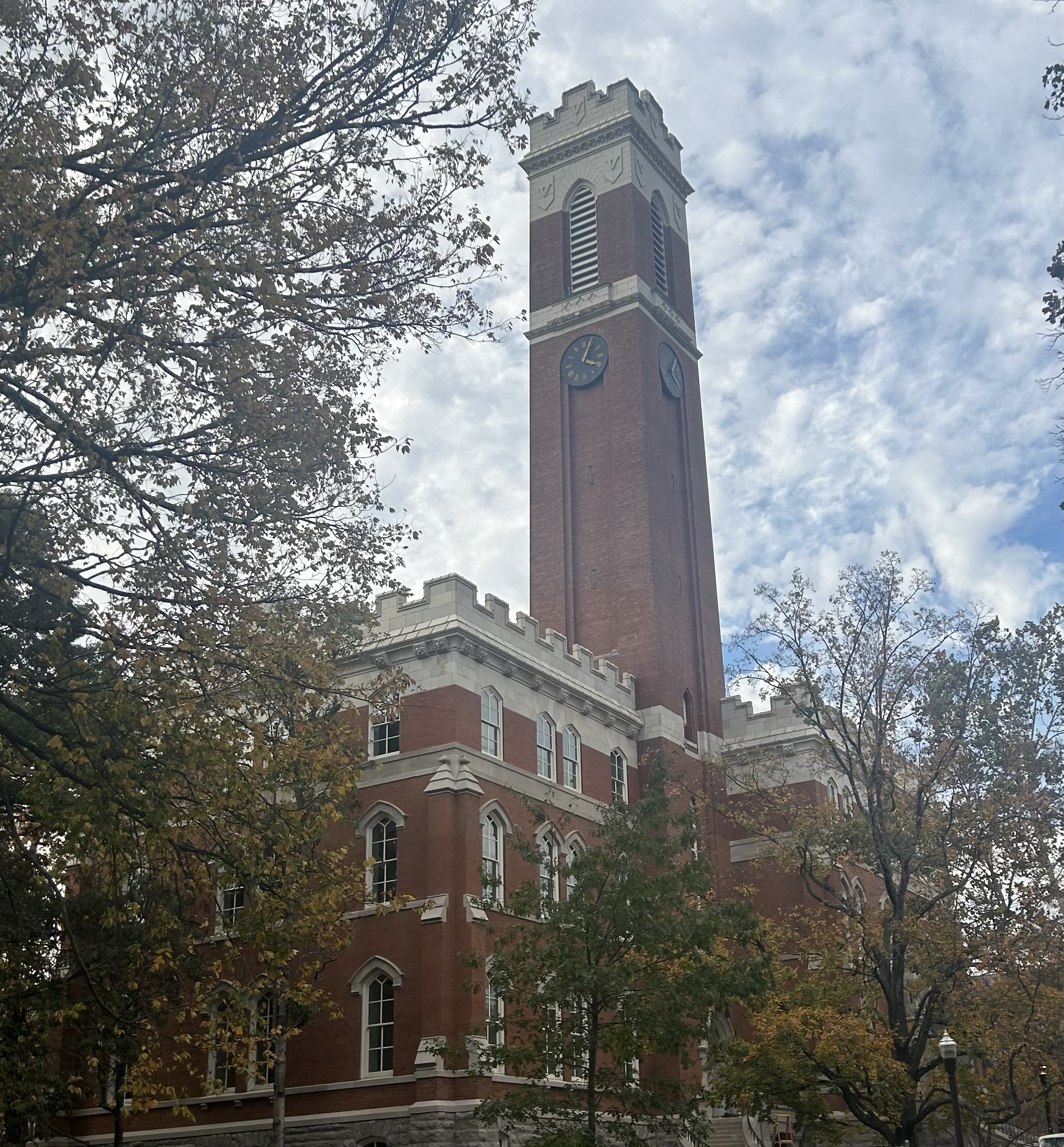
- Interactive map of the Kirkland Hall area

General information
- Type: Clock tower
- Architectural style: Italianate
- Location: Nashville, Tennessee
- Coordinates: 36°08′53.6″N 86°48′10.0″W
- Construction started: 1874
- Completed: 1875

Height
- Height: 170 feet (52 m)

Kirkland Hall, designed by William Crawford Smith, was built in 1874 as the first teaching building at Vanderbilt University in Nashville, Tennessee. Located on the then 74-acre main campus of Vanderbilt, it burned down in 1905 due to a large fire and was rebuilt in 1906. In the following years, many renovations and reconstructions took place on various scales. In 2015, the FUTURE VU Initiative was proposed, with one of the projects being the Kirkland Hall renovation. Initially projected to be completed in October 2023, the project was only finalized in the early months of 2024.

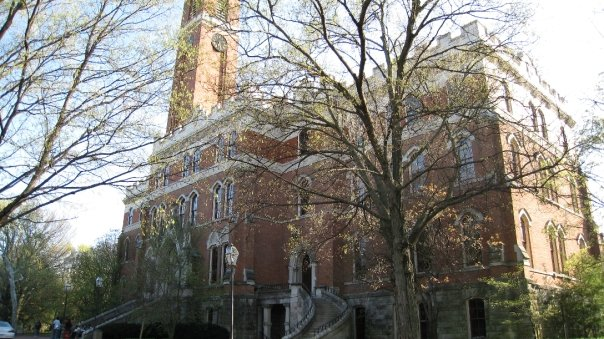
Kirkland Hall rebuilt with only one tower

The original Kirkland Hall – also known as Main Building, Old Main, University Hall, and College Hall – was initially constructed in the Victorian Gothic style, featuring two towers flanking a central gable that protruded outward, much like a pediment. After the fire of 1905, Kirkland Hall was rebuilt in the Italianate style, with only one tower reconstructed. Donations from alumni, Vanderbilt students, and Nashville residents funded a new bell to replace the old one. In 1937, Chancellor James Hampton Kirkland ended his leadership and died on August 5, 1939. In recognition of his contributions to the university, the board renamed the building from Old Main (recently called College Hall) to Kirkland Hall.

Until March 2024, the renovation of Kirkland Hall remained closed, allegedly due to construction. Protests took place both inside and outside the building, leading to the suspension of several students.

== History ==
In July 1874, Bishop McTyeire commissioned William Crawford Smith to design and construct the first buildings of the Vanderbilt Campus. In April 1874, Smith joined in laying the cornerstone of the first main building, now known as Kirkland Hall. The building housed classrooms, libraries, laboratories, seven new faculty homes, and a small observatory.

=== 1875–1905 ===
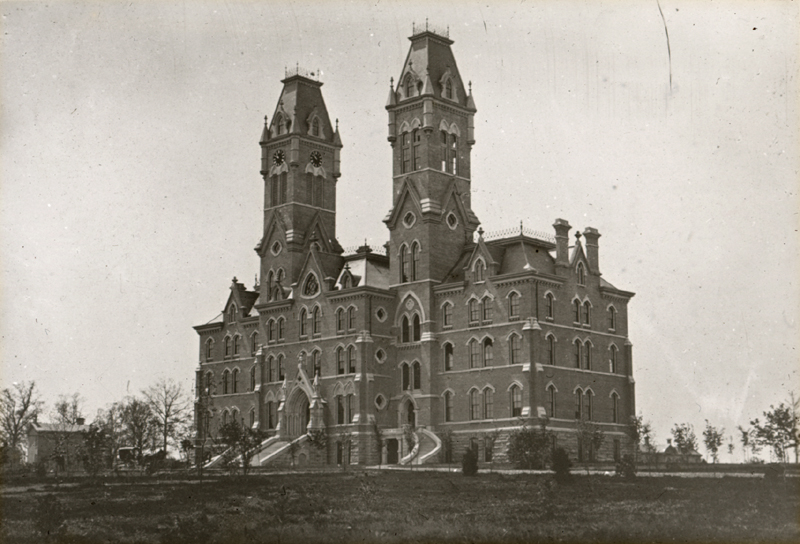
The Main Building

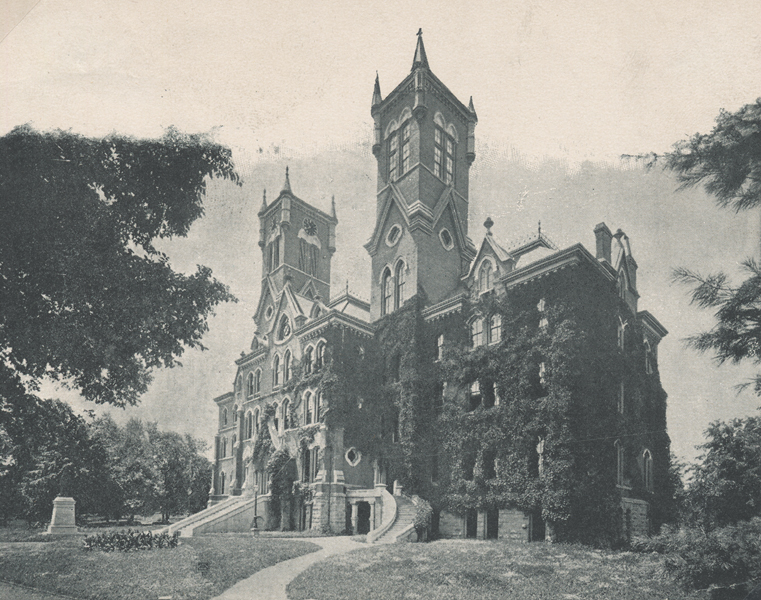
Kirkland Hall with two towers

From the onset of the Main Building's construction, its design was overseen by the first Chancellor, Landon C. Garland, who was assigned by Bishop McTyeire to collaborate with William C. Smith on the project. Although Garland did not focus on the Victorian Gothic style in general, he was primarily concerned with supervising the design of scientific rooms in the Main Building. However, despite careful planning and inspections, the Main Building faced issues of overcrowding. During 1878–1879, the overcrowding problem was alleviated by Science Hall, which accommodated geology labs.

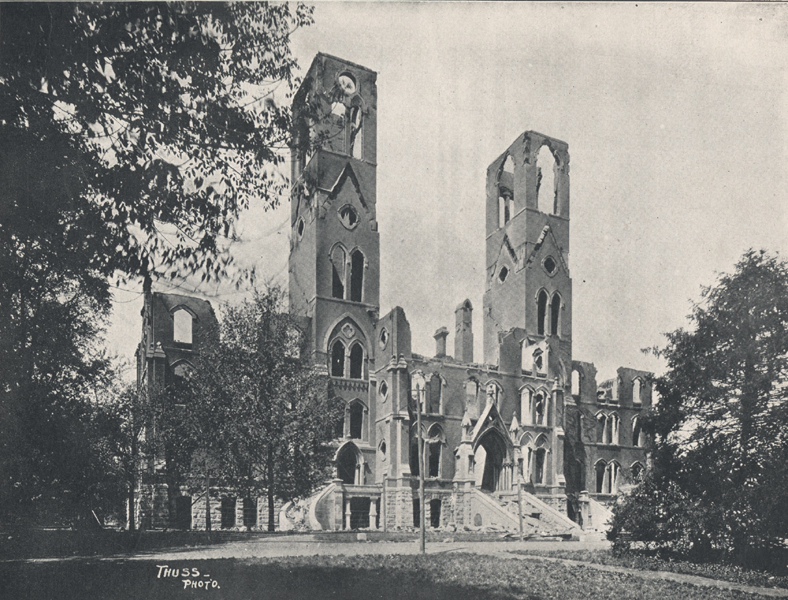
Kirkland Hall After the Fire

In 1884–1885, Vanderbilt University experienced a low point. Enrollment dropped, and arsonists set fire to the Main Building and others. The Main Building withstood this disaster and remained one of the most imposing structures on campus. About a decade later, in 1899, with the help of a new endowment totaling $1.2 million, the heating and sewage systems on campus were rebuilt. The Main Building was connected to Science Hall via pipes, and water closets in the Main Building met the water supply demands of the college.

On Thursday, April 20, 1905, Vanderbilt students attended their morning classes as usual, unaware of what was forthcoming. Around 11 a.m., they smelled smoke, and later, when the blaze was discovered, it was already uncontrollable due to the ineffectiveness of the water system. Students fled the building, some bringing their books with them. Many threw books and lab apparatus, the precious assets that Chancellor Garland had brought back to Vanderbilt decades ago, out of the windows. The Nashville fire department arrived but was unable to save the building. The Old Main, proudly standing for almost 20 years, was reduced to only the outer shell.

Fortunately, casualties were minimal, and many books and machines were saved. The main library, located on the top floor, originally contained around 22,000 books, 4,000 of which were saved by the students. On that day, Chancellor James Kirkland addressed the calamity in a letter to the anxious student body. He reassured them that the academic program would not be interrupted and praised the student body for standing with Vanderbilt University with unwavering confidence. The next morning, Friday, classes began normally at 8 a.m. in substitute buildings.

=== 1906–1939 ===
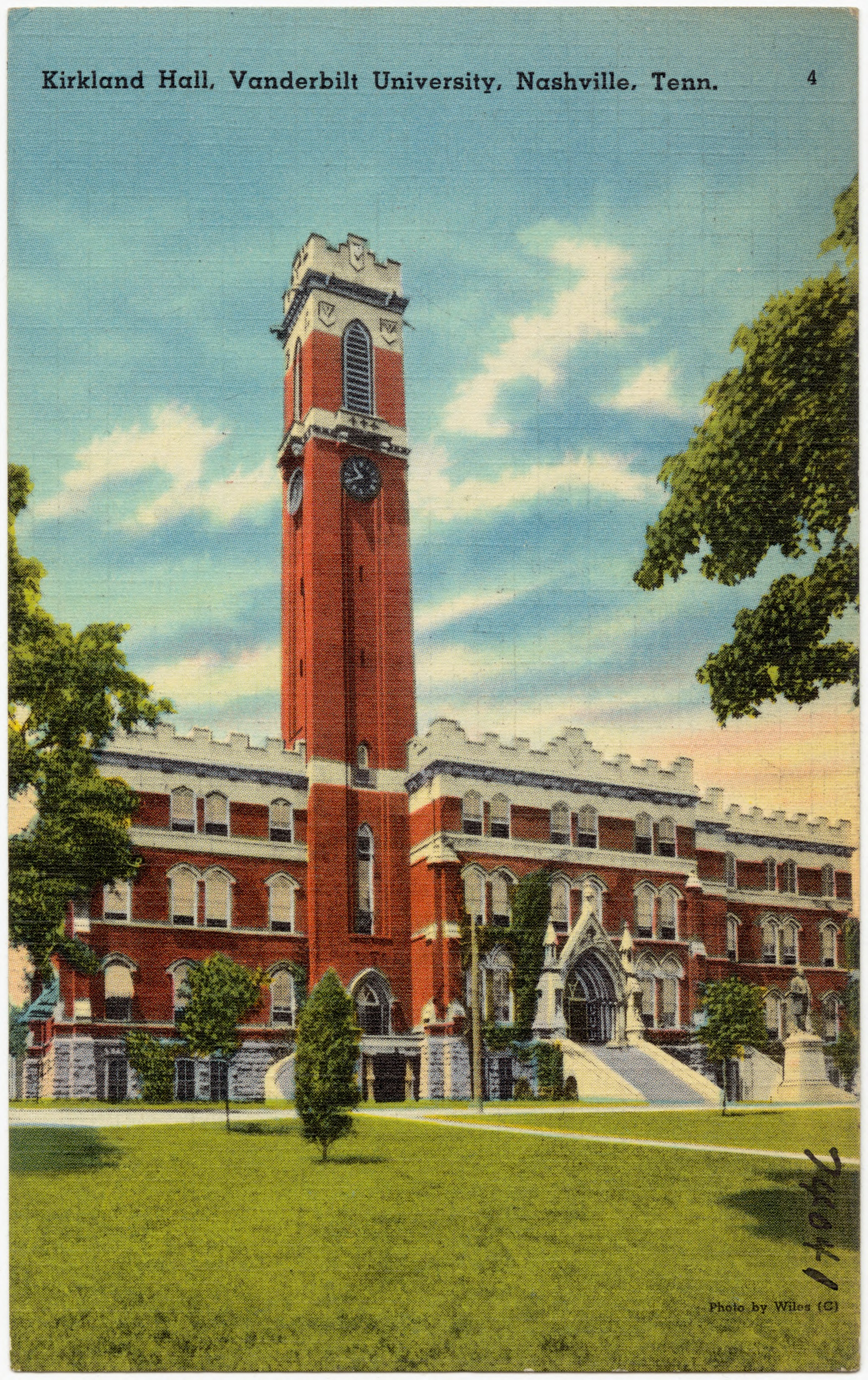
Kirkland Hall

Although its Main Building had burnt to the ground in 1905, the morale of the Vanderbilt community remained high. Before this fire, the university was in a serious financial crisis and had failed to meet its proposed academic expenses. Chancellor James Kirkland, seeing an opportunity in the crisis, deemed the fire the perfect time for fundraising. William K. Vanderbilt, grandson of Cornelius Vanderbilt, contributed $150,000; the citizens of Nashville pledged over $50,000; and alumni contributed around $10,000. Even the children on campus collected $553, enough for a new clock and bell.

The raised funds were able to meet the restoration costs of the building. He and his engineers directed the project. Although the rebuilding of the Main failed to include a new library due to a rejection of the expected grant from Andrew Carnegie, the restoration, in general, was satisfying to the Vanderbilt community. A flat roof replaced the original gables, a single tower was erected, and perhaps most importantly, the interior was reinforced with concrete, making it finally fireproof. Despite lacking the old magnificence, the construction of the new Main (then called College Hall) nonetheless manifested the solidarity of the Vanderbilt community.

In the following years, College Hall constantly faced the pressure of limited spatial capacity. By World War I, enrollment had soared, and the four classroom buildings exhibited inadequacies in meeting the booming academic needs of all students. In 1925, 162 law students occupied the top floor of College Hall, and over 1,000 students crammed into the four class buildings - Main, Furman, Science, and Engineering. The circumstances became even more dire in 1927 when an additional 20,000 volumes of selected books were added to College Hall's 50,000-volume repertoire. By 1933, College Hall had to accommodate engineering students, as the Engineering building could no longer house them all. The critical moment came on February 19, 1932, when Wesley Hall burned down. The reconstruction cost for Wesley Hall was too great to be met, and it was not rebuilt. Consequently, the student body had to be disseminated to other classrooms, worsening the situation.

Despite all these years of challenges, College Hall stood resilient. A non-negligible contributor to its endurance was James Hampton Kirkland. During his tenure at Vanderbilt, he boosted enrollment, grew the faculty, developed the campus, raised funds, and saved the institution from many crises. On January 2, 1937, Kirkland submitted his official resignation letter. Two years later, on August 5, 1939, he died shortly after moving to his lakeside cabin in Ontario. Out of respect, the Board of Trust renamed College Hall to Kirkland Hall.

=== 1940–present ===
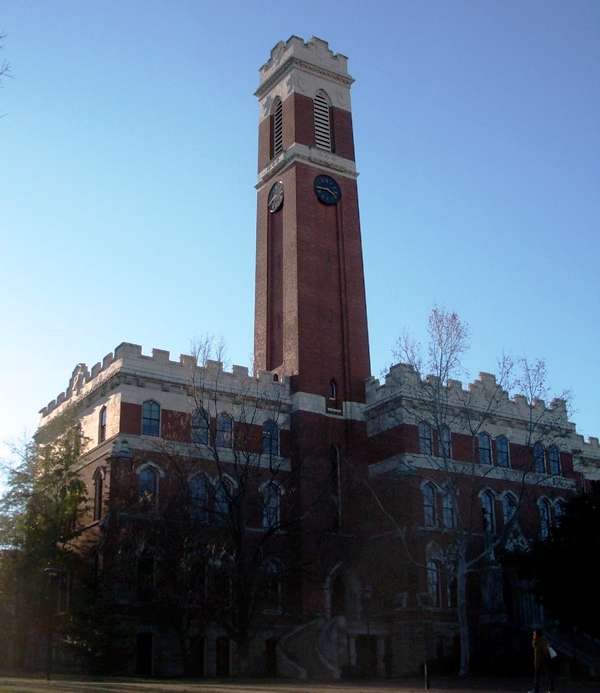
Recent Kirkland

In the 1950s, fraternities and sororities dominated much of Vanderbilt student life. By 1959, 76 percent of male students and 79 percent of female students were involved in social fraternities and sororities. Then-Chancellor Harvie Branscomb sought a reformation to shift students' sense of belonging from their fraternities and sororities to the university itself. The reform, which began in early 1951, faced significant resistance. In April and May 1959, violence broke out. On Sunday, May 17, students orchestrated a prank by hacking the new carillon installed in Kirkland Tower, making a ghostly indictment of the new fraternity scheme in the name of the "Ghost of Kirkland". The situation escalated when 500 boys, many in pajamas, gathered in front of the tower, shooting off firecrackers, throwing water-filled bags, and threatening a "panty raid" at the women's dorms. On Tuesday, a more determined group of around 250 students tried to get into two dorms, prompting serious action from the deans. The names of as many boys as possible were collected for disciplinary actions. The "Ghost of Kirkland" was accused, and the hackers were initially expelled, although they were later allowed to make up for the semester while remaining on probation.

In 1960, another picketing took place at Kirkland Hall. In early March, Divinity School students picketed Kirkland Hall in support of James Lawson, a Divinity School student who was expelled from Vanderbilt due to racial conflicts. As early as November 1959, a number of Black college students hosted sit-ins at Harveys and Cain-Sloan department stores, demonstrating against injustice and asking to speak with the owners. Lawson participated in this series of activities, applauded the students' efforts, taught them how to perform nonviolent sit-ins with great self-discipline, and tried his best to ensure their success. However, he was identified as the leading organizer, and as tensions grew, he was accused of advising young people to violate the law. Facing immense pressure, Chancellor Branscomb held board meetings to discuss action against Lawson, which eventually led to his expulsion. The debate over the controversial decision was relentless, and Kirkland Hall was one of the locations where protestors gathered.

Six years later, in 1966, an expansion and renovation of Kirkland Hall began, following ambitious academic facility expansions. In 1968, the rear entry stairs, the rear 4th and 5th floors, elevators, and a dock ramp were added. The current HVAC and electrical systems were installed in 1988.

=== 2023 renovation ===
To celebrate the 150th anniversary of its founding, Vanderbilt dedicated over $20 million to completing the fifth project of FUTURE VU—the renovation of Kirkland Hall—which began in 2022 and concluded in 2023. In a 2023 debrief, Chancellor Daniel Diermeier admitted that Kirkland Hall had not been renovated for around 25 years and faced issues with the water system, windows, floor instabilities, and other problems.

The project, led by Centric Architecture, a Nashville-based design firm, aimed to enhance accessibility and inclusion, connectivity and community engagement, and sustainability. Key project details include making the entrance accessible, repairing the roof and drainage system, and redesigning the restrooms to be gender-neutral. Initially, the project was expected to be completed in October 2023 but was only finished in early 2024.

== James Hampton Kirkland ==
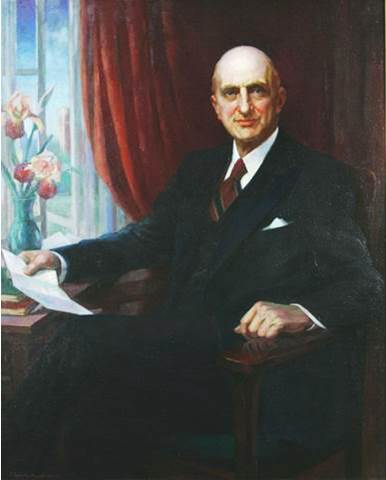
James H. Kirkland, portrait by Ella Sophonisba Hergesheimer

James Hampton Kirkland was born and raised in Spartanburg, South Carolina on September 9, 1859. He received his college education at Wofford College in Spartanburg and earned his PhD at Leipzig University. After graduation, he was appointed Professor of Latin at Vanderbilt University in 1886. Seven years later, he was appointed as Vanderbilt University's second Chancellor.

During his tenure, he raised funds, developed the campus, and led Vanderbilt University through various crises. Two prominent contributions included the 1905 Main Fire and the 1910 Methodist conflict. In the former crisis, he helped boost morale, raised renovation funds, and resumed the normal academic schedule as quickly as possible. In the latter, he managed to strip the Methodist church's right to name board members, gaining Vanderbilt relative independence from the church. In 1937, he ended his tenure, and two years later, he died in Ontario. Kirkland is regarded as one of the most important chancellors in Vanderbilt history. After his death, the board renamed the Main Building in his honor.

== Present day ==
Today, Kirkland Hall is primarily used as an office building and no longer holds regular academic classes. However, it remains a hub of activity on campus, hosting both festival celebrations and protests. In recent years, it has been the site of numerous sit-ins and picketing events.

=== 2012 protest ===
To end Vanderbilt's investment in an African agricultural corporation accused of land-grabbing, Vanderbilt students organized a sit-in at Kirkland and a two-month-long "tent city" starting in mid-March 2012. The university allegedly eliminated the company from its endowment in 2013, and Chancellor Nicholas Zeppos personally responded to the letter submitted by the activists.

=== 2015 protest ===
In 2015, Vanderbilt's Hidden Dores, led by Akaninyene Ruffin, silently marched to Kirkland Hall. Each student presented a signed list of demands to Zeppos, advocating for a more prominent student role in discussions regarding diversity, equity, and inclusion. They also emphasized the necessity of improvements in mental health assistance, curriculum, staffing, accountability, and policy.

=== 2016 protest ===
On Nov. 11, 2016, hundreds of members of the Vanderbilt community gathered to protest Donald Trump's election as president.

The demonstrators marched across campus, passing through Rand Hall, Sarratt Student Center, the Divinity School, Law School, Warren and Moore Colleges, Wilson Hall, and finally reaching Kirkland Hall.

Five days later, students sat outside Kirkland Hall, demanding that Zeppos declare Vanderbilt a “Sanctuary Campus” for undocumented immigrants. From 12:30 p.m. to 4:30 p.m., the students hosted a sit-in to pressure Chancellor Zeppos, who happened to be out of office.

=== 2018 Legend's Tour ===
On Oct. 24 at 5:30 p.m., outside Kirkland Hall, students celebrated Halloween by spooking each other.

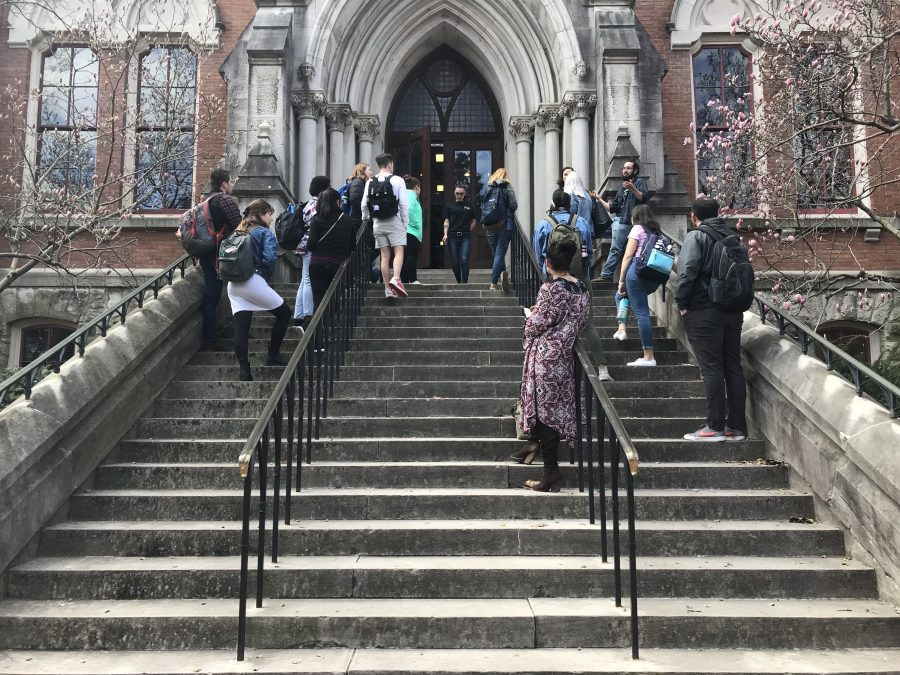
2019 Protest

=== 2019 protest ===
Dr. BethAnn McLaughlin, a professor at Vanderbilt Medical School advocating for tenure, had her previously approved tenure decision overturned due to her involvement in multiple Title IX investigations. This decision was reportedly a retaliation by some members of the university. The only remedy was for Chancellor Zeppos, who had the final say on this matter, to overturn her rejection. Students supporting Dr. McLaughlin held sit-ins in front of Kirkland Hall.

=== 2022 protest ===
Dores Divest organized a climate walkout at 12 p.m. CST on February 16, 2022, in front of Rand Dining Hall. The walkout ended with a march to Kirkland Hall. The purpose was to protest the university's investment in fossil fuels.

=== 2024 protest ===
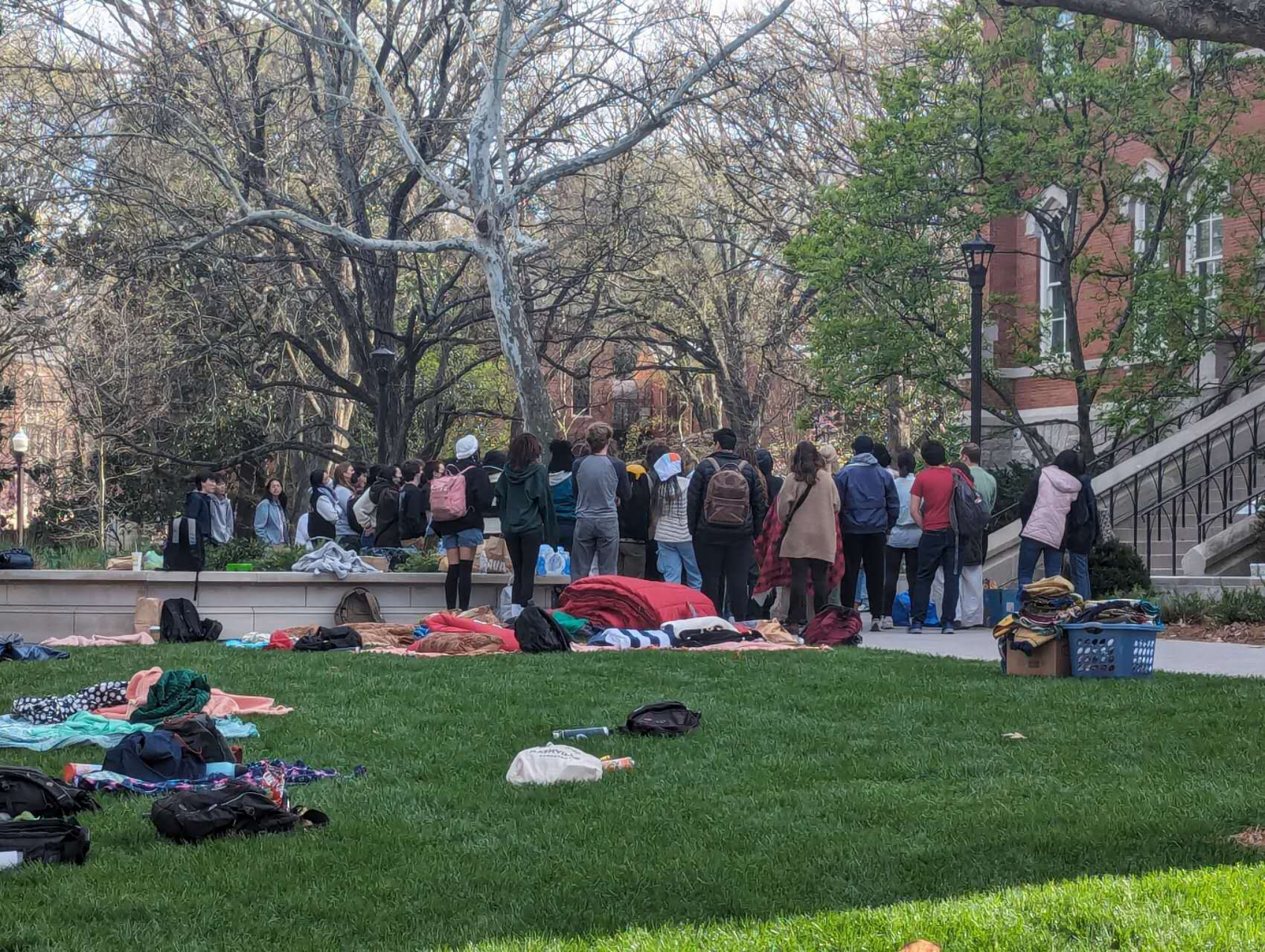
2024 Protest

On March 26, 2024, a group of students entered Kirkland Hall with the intention of protesting while it was reportedly still closed for construction, demanding a higher degree of free speech amidst the ongoing conflict in Gaza. The sit-in continued until 6 a.m. the next morning, resulting in 27 students being suspended. Eli Motycka, a reporter for the Nashville Scene, was arrested by VUPD near Kirkland Hall while covering the student protests. Many students rallied outside the building in support of their suspended peers throughout the following week. The university expelled three students, suspended one, and placed 22 students on disciplinary probation in relation to the protest. Alumni and faculty issued open letters criticizing student BDS efforts, calling for campus civility, and expressing solidarity with Vanderbilt’s pro-Israel Jewish community. As of publication, the letters had 124 signatories—35 faculty and 89 alumni—with Vanderbilt Jewish Alumni reporting at least 15 more pending signatories.
