= Lewis Branscomb =

Lewis Branscomb may refer to:

- Lewis M. Branscomb (1926–2023), American physicist, government policy advisor, and corporate research manager
- Lewis C. Branscomb (1865–1930), American Methodist minister in Alabama
