= G. Alexander Heard =

George Alexander Heard
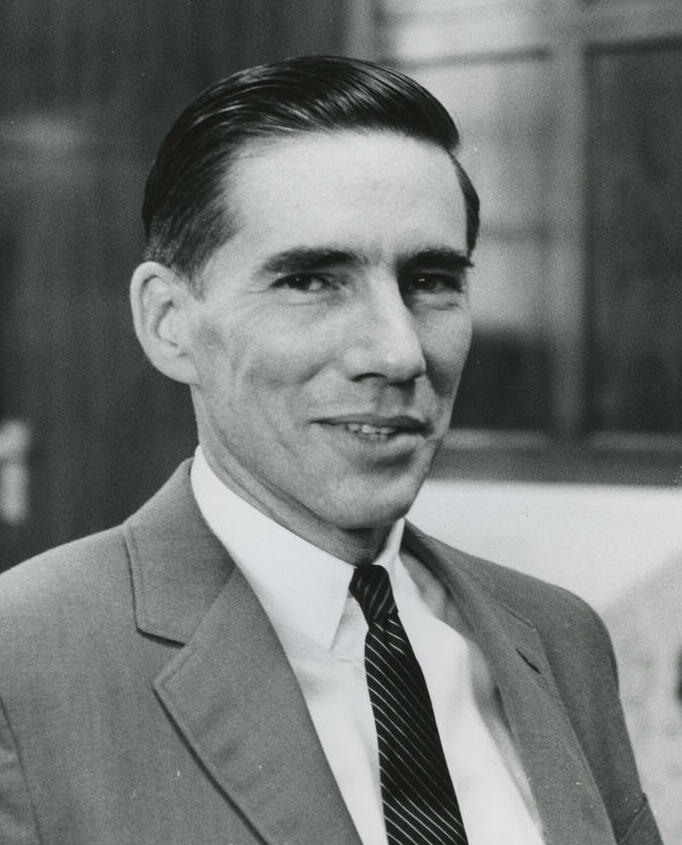

5th Chancellor of Vanderbilt University
- In office 1963–1982
- Preceded by: Harvie Branscomb
- Succeeded by: Joe B. Wyatt

Personal details
- Born: March 14, 1917 Savannah, Georgia, U.S.
- Died: July 24, 2009 (aged 92) Nashville, Tennessee, U.S.
- Education: University of North Carolina at Chapel Hill (BA); Columbia University (MA, PhD)

George Alexander Heard (March 14, 1917 – July 24, 2009) was chancellor of Vanderbilt University from 1963 to 1982. He was also a political scientist and adviser to U.S. presidents John F. Kennedy, Lyndon B. Johnson, and Richard Nixon.

== Biography ==
=== Early years and education ===
George Alexander Heard was born on March 14, 1917, in Savannah, Georgia. He received a bachelor's degree from the University of North Carolina at Chapel Hill and master's degree and Ph.D. from Columbia University, all in political science. In later years, Heard received 27 honorary degrees, including degrees from Johns Hopkins University and Bard College. While a student at UNC, he became a member of Sigma Alpha Epsilon fraternity and Phi Beta Kappa society.

=== Academic career ===
Heard was appointed as Chancellor of Vanderbilt University in 1963 during a time when many university administrators were confronting much internal strife and division in their respective institutions. He held quite frequent meetings with student leaders, even some of the university's most radical elements.

Heard was a staunch defender of the open forum, in a period of great social and political discontent, earning the respect of the students. He defended what he saw as the "students' and faculty's [right] to invite to the campus speakers of all political persuasions in an effort to better understand their views". As a result of this view many figures considered controversial spoke at Vanderbilt, most notably the civil rights movement activist Martin Luther King Jr. and an advocate of black power, Stokely Carmichael. Controversy engulfed Heard for Carmichael's invitation, yet he remained calm and staunchly supportive of his action, saying that "the university’s obligation is not to protect students from ideas, but rather to expose them to ideas, and to help make them capable of handling and, hopefully, having ideas." In particular, Heard was blamed for the racially charged riot that ensued by Vanderbilt trustee James G. Stahlman.

Heard increased the curricular options through the acquisition of the George Peabody College and the establishments of the Peabody College of Education and Human Development, the Blair School of Music and, the Owen Graduate School of Management. He also doubled enrollment, increased the annual budget, and recruited many new professors, distinguished for excellence both as teachers and as researchers.

=== Scholarly contributions ===
Among his scholarly contributions, Heard in 1952 published A Two-Party South?, in which he predicted the transformation of the Southern United States from one-party Democratic allegiance to two-party Democratic-Republican rivalry. At the time the Republican Party was virtually nonexistent in much of the South.

On May 8, 1970, Heard was appointed Special Adviser on the Academic Community and the Young by President Nixon. Heard also served as chairman of the Ford Foundation when McGeorge Bundy was president. During his career at Vanderbilt, Heard was offered the presidency of other institutions including Columbia University, but consistently declined, returning to Vanderbilt.

== Death and legacy ==
Heard died July 24, 2009, in Nashville, Tennessee. Along with his wife Jean, Alexander Heard is the eponym of Vanderbilt's Jean and Alexander Heard Library, and the university, annually since 1982, has given a faculty member who has demonstrated exceptional understanding of contemporary society the Alexander Heard Distinguished Service Professor Award.

== Bibliography ==
- Southern Primaries and Elections: 1920-1949 (1950)
- A Two-Party South? (1952)
- Made in America: Improving the Nomination and Election of Presidents (co-authored with Scarlett G. Graham, Kay L. Hancock, 1990)
- Speaking of the University: Two Decades at Vanderbilt (1995)

Academic offices
Preceded by Harvie Branscomb	Chancellor of Vanderbilt University; 1963–1982	Succeeded by Joe B. Wyatt
