= Branscombe (disambiguation) =

Branscombe is a village in Devon, England.

Branscombe may also refer to:

== People ==
- Branscombe Richmond (born 1955), American actor
- Alan Branscombe (1936–1986), English jazz musician
- Gena Branscombe (1881–1977), Canadian composer
- Lily Branscombe (1876–1970), New Zealand born actress
- Peter Branscombe (1929–2008), English musicologist
- Walter Branscombe (c. 1220–1280), bishop of Exeter, England

== See also ==
- Branscomb (disambiguation)
