= Ben Vaughan Branscomb =

American physician (1924–2016)

- Born: Ben Vaughan Branscomb; February 1, 1924; Durham, North Carolina, U.S.
- Died: July 4, 2016 (aged 92); Alabama, U.S.
- Education: Duke University School of Medicine
- Spouse: Jane Long (Moreland) Branscomb (c. 1948-2010; her death)
- Children: 4
- Relatives: Bennett Harvie Branscomb (father)
- Medical career
- Profession: Physician
- Sub-specialties: Pulmonology

Ben Vaughan Branscomb (February 1, 1924 – July 4, 2016) was the first pulmonary physician at the National Institutes of Health (NIH), a Distinguished Professor of Medicine at the University of Alabama at Birmingham, and influential in establishing the field of pulmonary medicine.

Branscomb was an early critic of smoking as a cause of lung disease before that fact was publicly acknowledged. Over his career he worked to educate the U.S. Congress, the medical profession, and the public about the health dangers of cigarettes and environmental pollution and the need to protect clean air. His research and advocacy were influential in the enforcement of the Clean Air Act of 1970 in Alabama.

== Life and career ==
Branscomb was born February 1, 1924, to Margaret Vaughan and Bennett Harvie Branscomb. His youth was spent in Asheville, N.C., where he attended the Asheville School for Boys, and in Durham, where his father served as Dean of Duke University School of Divinity before becoming Chancellor of Vanderbilt University. Branscomb entered Duke Medical School at age 17, responding to public calls for medical practitioners needed in World War II. After completion of his studies, he served briefly on a destroyer during the war.

Recruited to work in the National Heart Institute, later named the National Heart, Lung and Blood Institute, Branscomb was the first pulmonary physician at the National Institutes of Health (NIH).

In 1955 Branscomb was recruited to the faculty of University of Alabama at Birmingham (UAB), then named the Medical College of Alabama. He taught medical school courses and founded the UAB Division of Pulmonary, Allergy and Critical Care Medicine. He Chaired the division for 15 years and was named Distinguished Professor.

Branscomb retired from clinical practice in 1989 and from teaching in 2006. He was awarded a Lifetime Achievement Award by the American College of Physicians and the Lifetime Achievement Award of the Birmingham Business Journal's Health Care Heroes. He was inducted into the Alabama Healthcare Hall of Fame.

== Personal life and death ==
He was married to artist Jane Long (Moreland) Branscomb for 62 years until her death in 2010. They had 4 daughters. He died on July 4, 2016, aged 92.
