= Joe B. Wyatt =

American university president

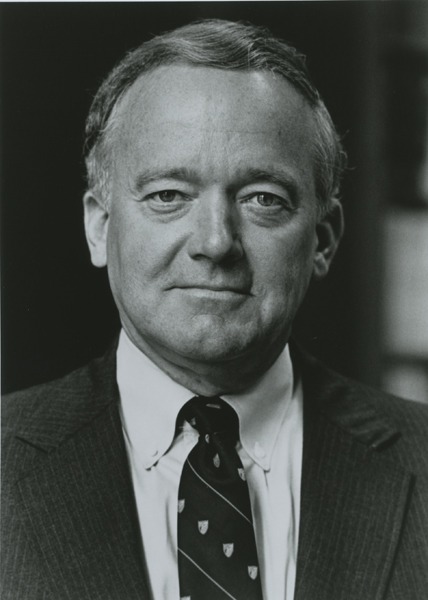
- Portrait of Joe Wyatt

6th Chancellor of Vanderbilt University
- In office 1982–2000
- Preceded by: G. Alexander Heard
- Succeeded by: E. Gordon Gee

Personal details
- Spouse: Faye Wyatt
- Education: Texas Christian University (BA); University of Texas at Austin (PhD)

Joe B. Wyatt served as the sixth chancellor of Vanderbilt University from 1982 to 2000. Prior to his appointment at Vanderbilt, Wyatt was the Vice President for Administration at Harvard University

== Early life ==
A native of Texas, Wyatt received a Bachelor of Arts in mathematics from Texas Christian University and a Ph.D. in the same field from the University of Texas at Austin.

== Career ==
In 1956, Wyatt worked as a computer scientist for General Dynamics Corporation. He cofounded Symbiotics International in 1965.

He taught computer sciences at the University of Houston from 1965 to 1972. He moved to Harvard University, where he first worked in the Office of Information Technology from 1972 to 1976 and as Vice President for Administration from 1976 to 1982. He led EDUCOM, a computer education network of 450 institutions and co-wrote Financial Planning Models for Colleges and Universities.

Wyatt served as the sixth chancellor of Vanderbilt University from 1982 to 2000. In 1998, during his tenure, the university received a US$300 million donation from Martha Rivers Ingram.

He served as Director of Ingram Industries from April 1990 to October 1996. He is a Director of El Paso Corporation and Chairman of the Universities Research Association. He is also a Director of the Advanced Network and Services, the EAA Aviation Foundation, Ingram Micro, Inc., and Hercules, Inc. He was a co-founder of the Massachusetts Technology Development Corporation, and is a former Chairman of the Nashville Area Chamber of Commerce and Government Industry Research Roundtable of the National Academy of Sciences. He is also a member of the American Association for the Advancement of Science, Phi Beta Kappa, Sigma Xi, Beta Gamma Sigma., and Educause.

== Personal life ==
Wyatt has a wife, Faye.

Academic offices
Preceded by G. Alexander Heard	Chancellor of Vanderbilt University; 1982–2000	Succeeded by Gordon Gee
