= Nicholas S. Zeppos =

American attorney, academic and university administrator

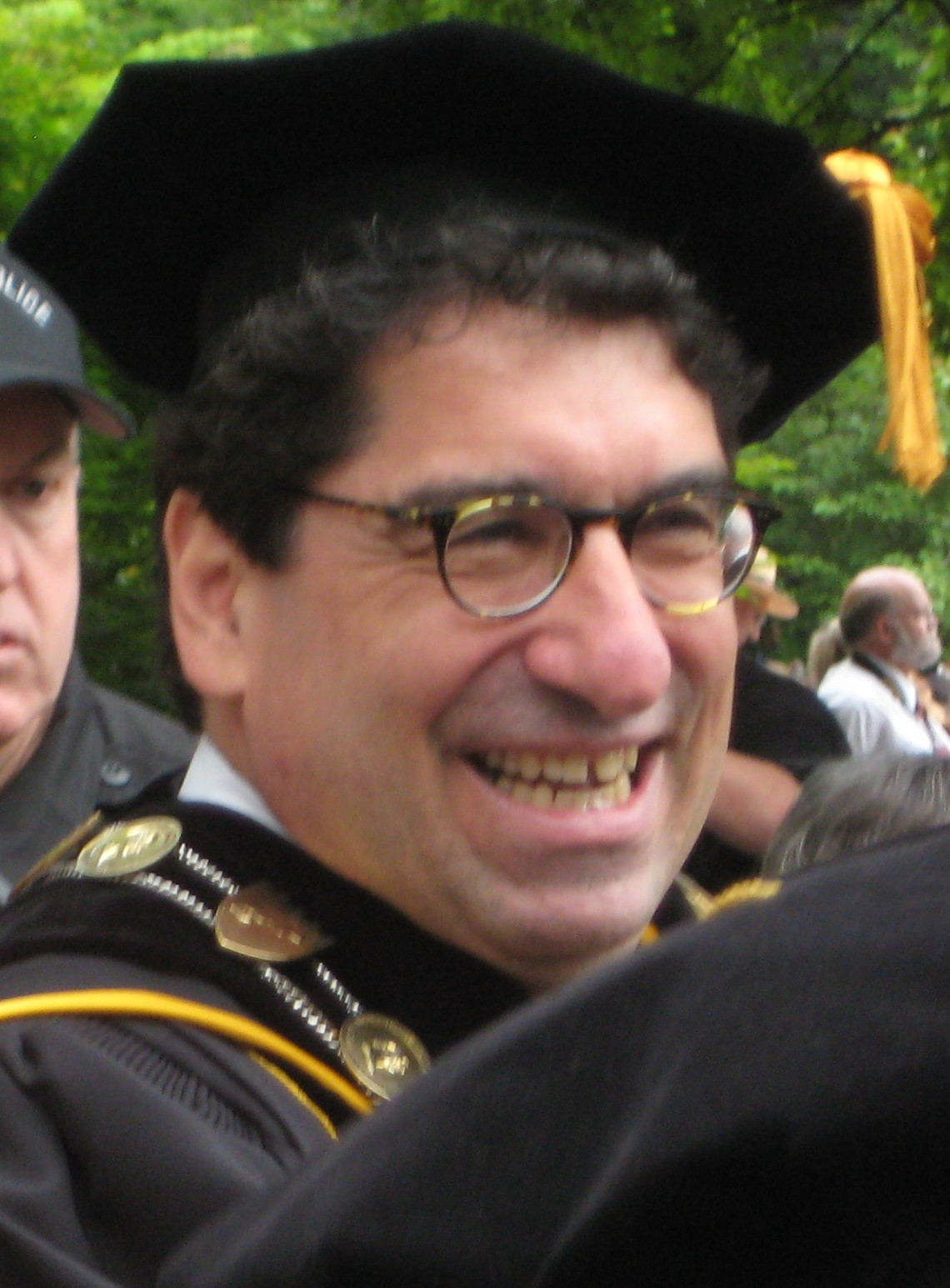
- Zeppos in 2008

8th Chancellor of Vanderbilt University
- In office August 1, 2007 – August 15, 2019
- Preceded by: Gordon Gee
- Succeeded by: Daniel Diermeier

Personal details
- Born: 1955 (age 70–71) Milwaukee, Wisconsin, U.S.
- Spouse: Lydia Howarth
- Children: 2
- Education: University of Wisconsin–Madison (BA, JD)

Nicholas S. Zeppos (born 1955) is an American attorney, academic and university administrator. He most recently served as the eighth chancellor of Vanderbilt University in Nashville, Tennessee from 2007 to 2019.

== Early life ==
Nicholas Zeppos was born in Milwaukee, Wisconsin in 1955. He received his B.A. in history in 1976 and his J.D. in 1979 from the University of Wisconsin–Madison. In 1978 and 1979, he served as the editor-in-chief of the Wisconsin Law Review.

== Career ==
Zeppos started his career as a practicing attorney in Washington, D.C. He joined the faculty of the Vanderbilt Law School in 1987. During his tenure at Vanderbilt, he has held a number of posts, including professor of law, associate dean of the law school, associate provost for academic affairs, vice chancellor for institutional planning and advancement, and, in 2001, provost and vice chancellor for academic affairs. In this last role, he oversaw academics, development, alumni relations, and residential and student life. After Gordon Gee's departure in 2007, he was named interim chancellor. He was named permanently as chancellor on March 1, 2008, by the university's Board of Trust. In 2009, he helped lead an expanded financial aid program called Opportunity Vanderbilt that replaced undergraduate need-based loans with grant and scholarship assistance.

He has also written widely on legislation, administrative law, and professional responsibility. He has served as the chair of the Scholars Committee on the Federal Judiciary and as chair of the Rules Advisory Committee of the U.S. Court of Appeals for the Sixth Circuit.

Zeppos was appointed to the National Security Higher Education Advisory Board, a program of the Federal Bureau of Investigation in 2005. He serves as the Chair of the Association of American Universities and on the Board of Directors of Fulbright Canada.

== Personal life ==
Zeppos is married to Lydia Howarth, a writer, and has two sons. His salary as chancellor was over $2.2 million.

According to OpenSecrets, Zeppos has contributed nearly $70,000 to Democrats, including Barack Obama and Elizabeth Warren, but has contributed also to Republicans including Bob Corker, Rick Perry, and Lamar Alexander.

Academic offices
Preceded by E. Gordon Gee	Chancellor of Vanderbilt University; March 1, 2008 – August 15, 2019	Succeeded by Daniel Diermeier
