= List of chancellors of Vanderbilt University =

The following is a list of chancellors of Vanderbilt University

No.	Image	Chancellor	Life	Tenure
1		Landon Garland	1810–1895	1875–1893
2		James Hampton Kirkland	1859–1939	1893–1937
3.		Oliver Carmichael	1891–1966	1937–1946
4		Harvie Branscomb	1894–1998	1946–1963
5		G. Alexander Heard	1917–2009	1963–1982
6		Joe B. Wyatt	1936–present	1982–2000
7		E. Gordon Gee	1944–present	2000–2007
8		Nicholas S. Zeppos	1955–present	2008–2019
9		Daniel Diermeier	1965–present	2020–present
