= Collier-Crichlow House =

Historic house in Tennessee, United States

- U.S. National Register of Historic Places
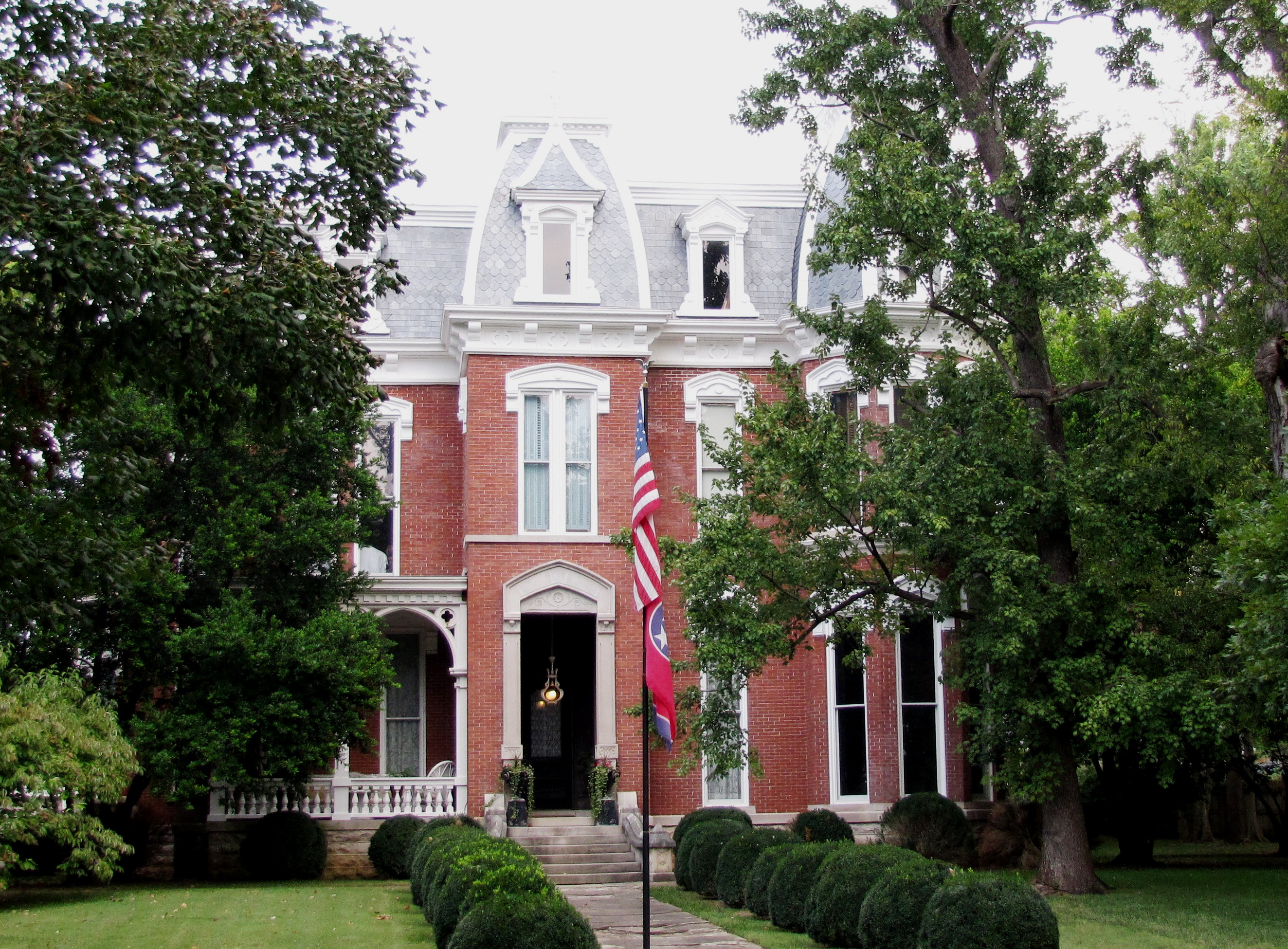
- The Collier-Crichlow House in 2010

- Location within Tennessee Location within the United States
- Location: 511 East Main Street, Murfreesboro, Tennessee
- Coordinates: 35°50′43.73″N 86°22′59.49″W
- Area: 5 acres (2.0 ha)
- Built: 1880
- Architect: William Crawford Smith
- Architectural style: Second Empire, Renaissance
- NRHP reference No.: 73001822
- Added to NRHP: July 16, 1973

The Collier-Crichlow House is a historic house in Murfreesboro, Tennessee, United States.

The house was built circa 1880 for Ingram Banks Collier III, who served as the mayor of Murfreesboro from 1872 to 1873. A relative, Colonel Newton C. Collier, also served as the mayor and as a director of the Nashville, Chattanooga and St. Louis Railway. Two other members of the Collier-Crichlow family served as Murfreesboro's mayor: James H. Crichlow and N. Collier Crichlow.

The house was designed by Confederate veteran and Nashville architect William Crawford Smith in the Second Empire style. It has been listed on the National Register of Historic Places since July 16, 1973.
