= James Hampton Kirkland =

American Latinist and university administrator

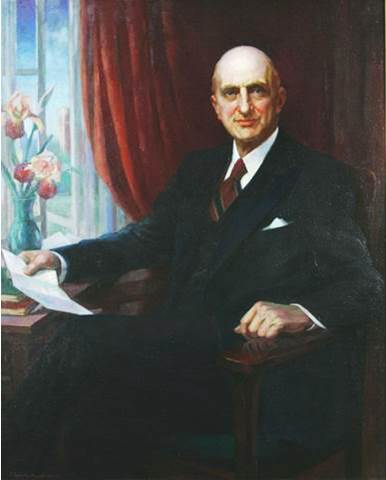
- Portrait by Ella Sophonisba Hergesheimer (1938)

2nd Chancellor of Vanderbilt University
- In office 1893–1937
- Preceded by: Landon Garland
- Succeeded by: Oliver Carmichael

Personal details
- Born: September 9, 1859 Spartanburg, South Carolina, U.S.
- Died: August 5, 1939 (aged 79) Ontario, Canada
- Spouse: Mary Henderson
- Children: 1 daughter
- Education: Wofford College (BA); Leipzig University (PhD)

James Hampton Kirkland (September 9, 1859 – August 5, 1939) was an American Latinist and university administrator. He served as the second chancellor of Vanderbilt University from 1893 to 1937.

== Early life ==
James Hampton Kirkland was born and raised in Spartanburg, South Carolina. His father, William Clark, was a Methodist pastor. His mother, Virginia Lawson Galluchat Kirkland, lived in Abilene, Texas, by the early 1880s.

Kirkland was educated at Wofford College in Spartanburg. Two of his teachers were William Malone Baskervill and Charles Forster Smith. It was Smith who suggested to Kirkland that he should study in Germany. As a result, he left the United States in 1883.

Kirkland enrolled at Leipzig University, where he studied "Greek, Latin, Sanskrit, and Anglo-Saxon". He received a PhD from Leipzig University in 1885. His PhD thesis was published in 1886 as a pamphlet entitled A Study of the Anglo-Saxon Poem, the Harrowing of Hell (Grein's Hollenfahrt Christi). It was an attempt to ascertain whether Cynewulf was the author of a poem entitled The Harrowing of Hell. Meanwhile, Kirkland spent a semester at Friedrich-Wilhelms-Universität, followed by a few months in Geneva, Switzerland, where he started learning French. He also visited Italy, Paris, and London.

== Career ==
Kirkland was appointed Professor of Latin at Vanderbilt University in 1886. Two of his colleagues were Baskervill and Smith, his former professors at Wofford. Another colleague was Milton W. Humphreys, a Confederate veteran who also received a PhD from the University of Leipzig. Two more colleagues had also studied at the University of Leipzig: Waller Deering and Alexander R. Hohlfeld. He edited the works of Horace, a Roman lyric poet in a collection entitled Horace: Satires and Epistles, which he published in 1893.

Meanwhile, Kirkland was appointed as chancellor in 1893. He was only thirty-three years old. According to Professor Edwin Mims, who served as the Chair of the English Department from 1912 to 1942, he was chosen for "his temperament, his training, and his personality."

In 1895, Kirkland was a co-founder of the Southern Association of Colleges and Schools. He served as its Secretary and Treasurer until 1908. He was also a member of Phi Delta Kappa.

Meanwhile, as the Chancellor of Vanderbilt University, Kirkland upheld the morale on campus when Old Main, a historic building on campus, caught fire. Under his leadership, classes resumed the next day. Nearly a decade later, in 1914, he oversaw the separation of Vanderbilt University from the Methodist Church. By the mid-1920s, he moved the Vanderbilt University Medical School to a new building on campus, thanks to donations from the Rockefeller Foundation and the General Education Board.

Kirkland published God and the New Knowledge with his colleague Edwin Mim and Oswald Eugene Brown in 1926.

Kirkland remained Chancellor during the Great Depression. In 1933, he was forced to lower faculty salaries. By June 1937, the budget had improved and he suggested raising the salaries back to their original levels. He retired as chancellor on July 1, 1937.

== Personal life ==
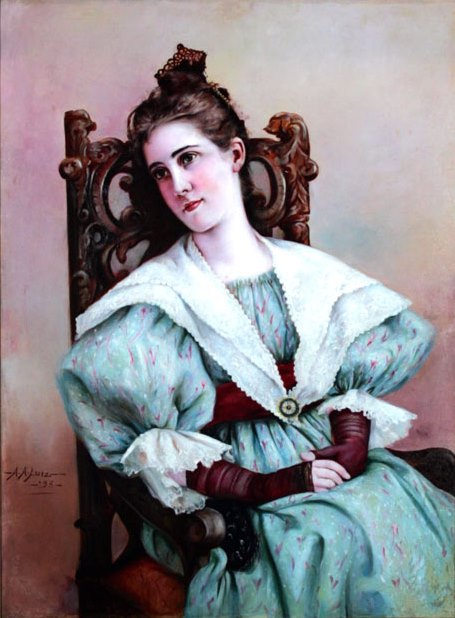
Mary Henderson Kirkland; by Adelia Armstrong Lutz

Kirkland married Mary Henderson. They had one daughter, Elizabeth. Kirkland summered near Ahmic Lake in Canada with his family and his friend, Abraham Flexner, from the 1910s.

== Death and legacy ==
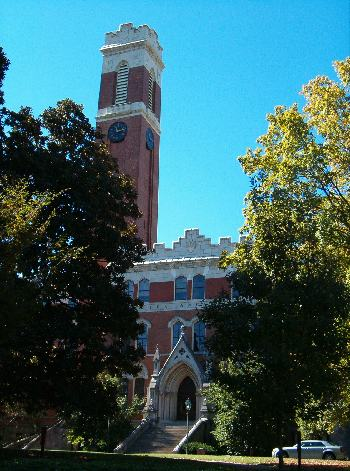
Kirkland Hall

Kirkland died on August 5, 1939, in Ontario, Canada, where he was vacationing. Old Main, Vanderbilt's administration building, was renamed Kirkland Hall in his honor. Kirkland's papers are kept at Vanderbilt University Archives and Special Collections.

Academic offices
Preceded by Landon Garland	Chancellor of Vanderbilt University; 1893–1937	Succeeded by Oliver Carmichael
