= National Security Higher Education Advisory Board =

The National Security Higher Education Advisory Board (NSHEAB) was created by Federal Bureau of Investigation (FBI) Director Robert S. Mueller III on December 15, 2005. Operated by the FBI and paneled by approximately 20 American university presidents and chancellors, the expressed purpose of the board is "to foster outreach and to promote understanding between higher education and the Federal Bureau of Investigation." The board also facilitates communication between universities and federal authorities on "national priorities pertaining to terrorism, counterintelligence, and homeland security."

== Aims ==
Since its creation NSHEAB has brought university and FBI officials together to discuss weapons of mass destruction, bioterrorism, threats to university research facilities, and "the promotion of strategic national security partnerships with academia [in] the United States." NSHEAB has also been a forum within which Intelligence Advanced Research Projects Activity (IARPA) has encouraged universities to engage in "high-risk/high-payoff" research intended to "provide the United States with an overwhelming intelligence advantage over future adversaries."

The National Security Higher Education Advisory Board is a part of "IARPA's mission to invest in high-risk/high-payoff research programs that have the potential to provide the United States with an overwhelming intelligence advantage over future adversaries."

— FBI National Press Release, 2009

A stated goal of NSHEAB is to prevent the theft of sensitive research conducted at American universities. Some other topics discussed at NSHEAB meetings have included cyber security, campus shootings, and export regulations, as well as domestic terrorism.

NSHEAB meets approximately three times yearly. Some meetings have included briefings by invited speakers from other federal agencies, such as the Office of the National Counterintelligence Executive, U.S. Customs and Border Protection, the United States Coast Guard, the Central Intelligence Agency, the Department of Commerce, and the Department of Defense.

NSHEAB is currently chaired by Lou Anna K. Simon, president of Michigan State University. Notable members of NSHEAB include or have included former United States Secretary of Defense Robert Gates, MIT president Susan Hockfield, Vanderbilt University chancellor Nicholas S. Zeppos, and U.C. Davis chancellor Linda P.B. Katehi.

== Criticism ==
Some academics have expressed concern over the collaboration between FBI and university officials due to the agency's past investigations of individuals in the academic community in the 1960s. NSHEAB's work and the increased cooperation between federal authorities and academia is facilitated by the political framework brought about by the war on terror.
