= Oliver Carmichael =

American academic (1891–1966)

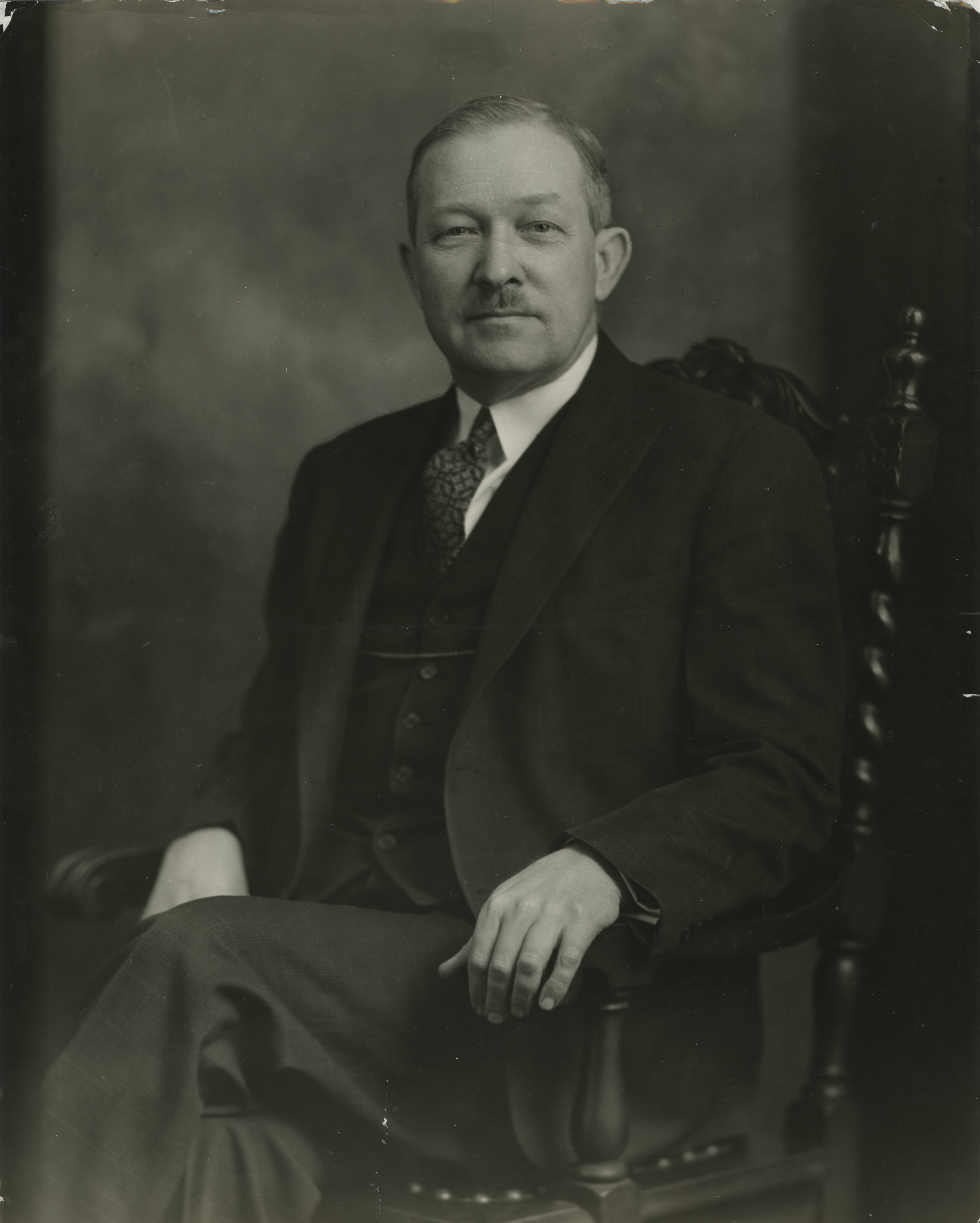

20th President of the University of Alabama
- In office 1953–1957
- Preceded by: Lee Bidgood (acting)
- Succeeded by: James H. Newman (acting)

3rd Chancellor of Vanderbilt University
- In office 1937–1946
- Preceded by: James H. Kirkland
- Succeeded by: Harvie Branscomb

4th President of Alabama College
- In office 1926–1935
- Preceded by: Thomas Waverly Palmer
- Succeeded by: Arthur Fort Harman

Personal details
- Born: October 3, 1891 Goodwater, Alabama, U.S.
- Died: September 25, 1966 (aged 74) Asheville, North Carolina, U.S.
- Education: Alabama Presbyterian College (BA); Wadham College, Oxford (BA); University of Alabama (MA)

Oliver Cromwell Carmichael (October 3, 1891 – September 25, 1966) served as the third chancellor of Vanderbilt University from 1937 to 1946. He also served as the President of the University of Alabama from 1953 to 1957.

== Early life ==
Oliver Cromwell Carmichael was born on October 3, 1891, the son of a farmer. He received a B.A. from Alabama Presbyterian College and an M.A. from the University of Alabama. He was a Rhodes Scholar at Oxford University, following Harvie Branscomb (1894–1998). He was the first Rhodes Scholar from Alabama.

He was the younger brother of mathematician Robert Daniel Carmichael.

== Career ==
Carmichael worked in a YMCA in India and East Africa. During the First World War, Carmichael and later Vanderbilt Chancellor Harvie Branscomb worked for the American Commission for Relief in Belgium under Herbert Hoover. He joined the British Army in 1915 and served in the East African campaign and commanded a field canteen. He returned to the United States but then joined the United States Army shortly after the American entry into World War I, serving as a first lieutenant with the 321st Regiment of the 81st Division on the Western Front from August 1918 onwards.

After the war, Belgium awarded Carmichael and Branscomb the Médaille du Roi Albert and Médaille de la Reine Élisabeth for their service. On his return, he became a high school principal. From 1926 to 1935, Carmichael served as the fourth president of Alabama College, now known as the University of Montevallo.

Carmichael became Dean of the Graduate School of Vanderbilt University in Nashville, Tennessee in 1935, and he was elevated to serve as the third chancellor of the university from 1937 to 1946. In 1939, he was also elected to the board of trustees of Duke University.

Carmichael served as the President of the Carnegie Foundation for the Advancement of Teaching from 1945 to 1953. During his tenure, he wrote an article entitled What Makes a Good College President.

Carmichael served as the President of the University of Alabama from 1953 to 1957. During his tenure, the football team lost consistently. He resigned over a "violent controversy" after expelling Autherine Lucy, an African-American student. While he broadly hinted that UA might have to comply with the U.S. Supreme Court's decision against segregation, the board of trustees did not agree. He ultimately resigned over the issue.

== Death ==
Carmichael died on September 25, 1966.

== Legacy ==
Carmichael Towers (1970–2019 and 1966–2021) on the campus of Vanderbilt University were four residential buildings named in his honor. In 2024, construction of the Oliver C. Carmichael Residential College was completed, replacing the Carmichael Towers and allowing students to move in for the 2024-2025 academic year.

The campus library at the University of Montevallo, on Bloch Street, completed in 1968, bears Carmichael's name.

== Bibliography ==
- Mead, Gary (2000). The Doughboys: America and the First World War. New York: Overlook Press. ISBN 1-58567-061-8. OCLC 44426879.

Academic offices
Preceded by James Hampton Kirkland	Chancellor of Vanderbilt University; 1937–1946	Succeeded by Harvie Branscomb
