= William Crawford Smith =

American architect and soldier (1837-1899)

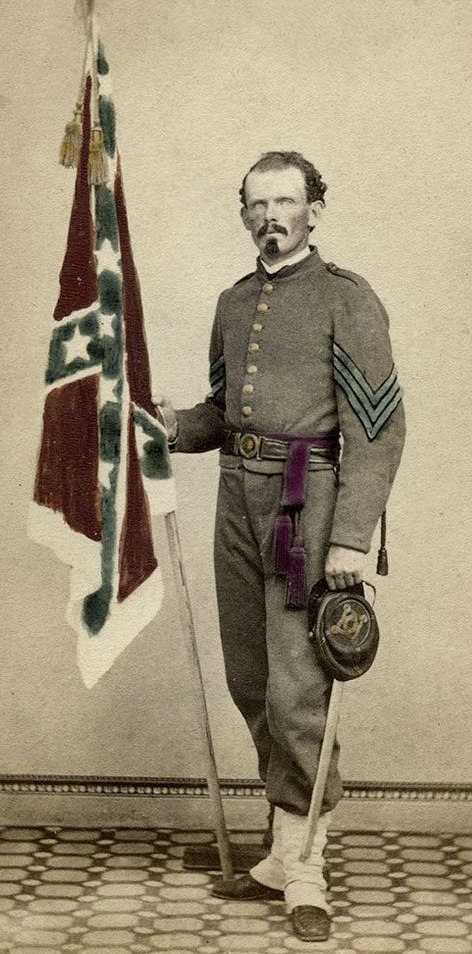
- Born: November 26, 1837; Petersburg, Virginia, U.S.
- Died: February 5, 1899 (aged 61); Manila, Philippines
- Resting place: Mount Olivet Cemetery
- Occupation: Architect
- Military career
- Allegiance: Confederate States of America; United States
- Branch: Confederate States Army; United States Army
- Service years: 1861–1865 (CSA); 1898–1899 (USA)
- Rank: Sergeant (CSA); Colonel (USA)
- Conflicts: American Civil War; Philippine–American War: Battle of Manila

William Crawford Smith (November 26, 1837 – February 5, 1899) was an American architect who served in the Confederate States Army during the American Civil War and in the United States Army during the Philippine–American War. He designed many buildings in Nashville, Tennessee, including Kirkland Hall, the first building on the campus of Vanderbilt University, and the Parthenon in Centennial Park.

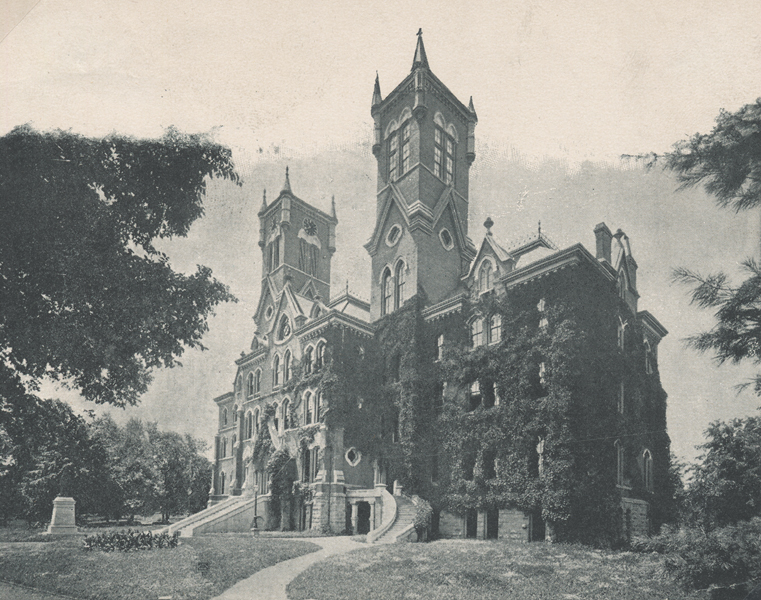
Kirkland Hall on the Vanderbilt University campus, designed by Smith.

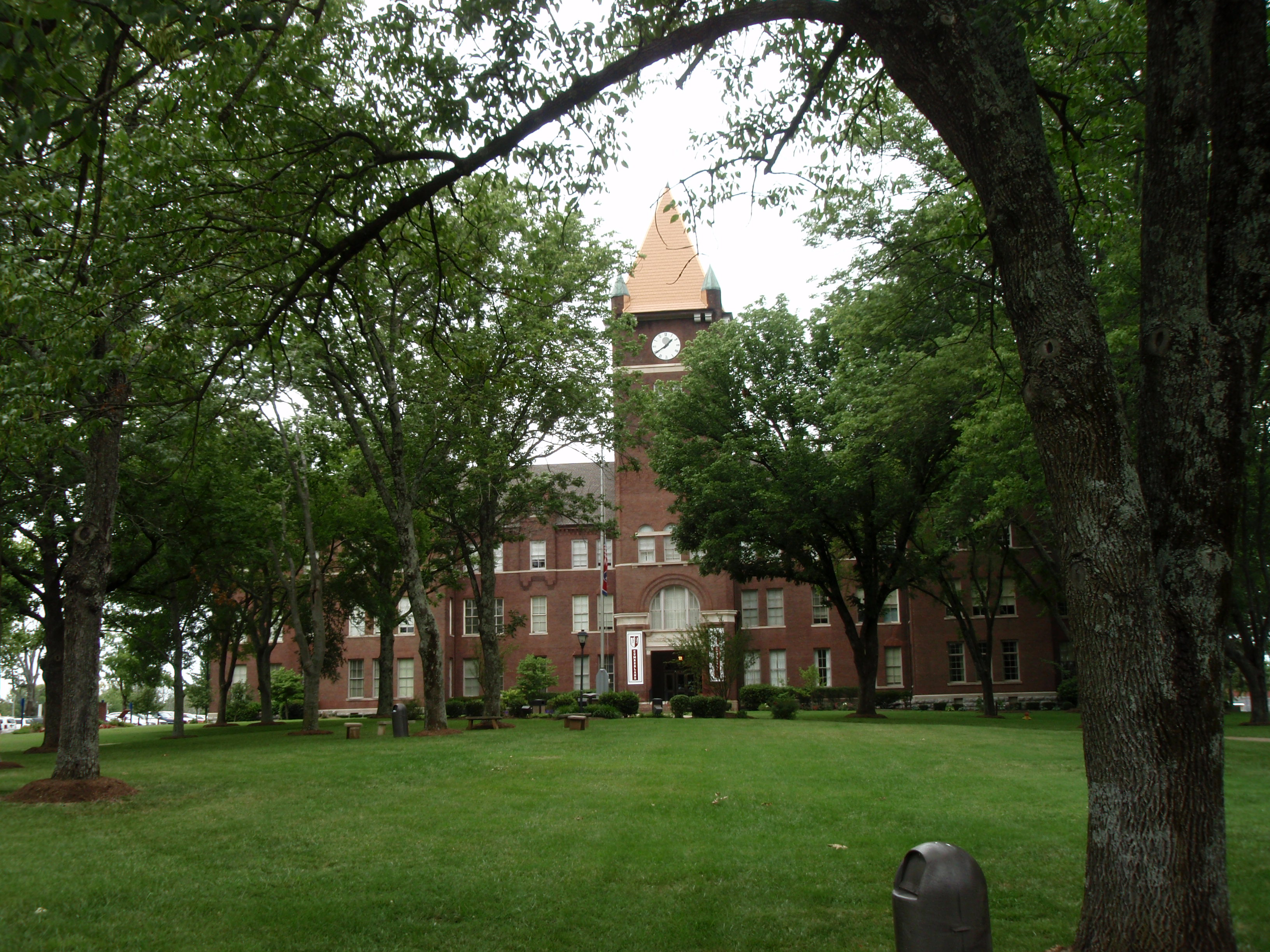
Memorial Hall on the Cumberland University campus, designed by Smith.

== Early life ==
William Crawford Smith was born on November 26, 1837, in Petersburg, Virginia. He moved to Nashville, Tennessee in the 1850s.

During the American Civil War of 1861–1865, he returned to Virginia, joined the Confederate States Army and served as a sergeant and ensign in the 12th Virginia Infantry. He fought in the First Battle of Bull Run, the Battle of Richmond, the Second Battle of Bull Run, and the Battle of Gettysburg. He was wounded twice in the war effort.

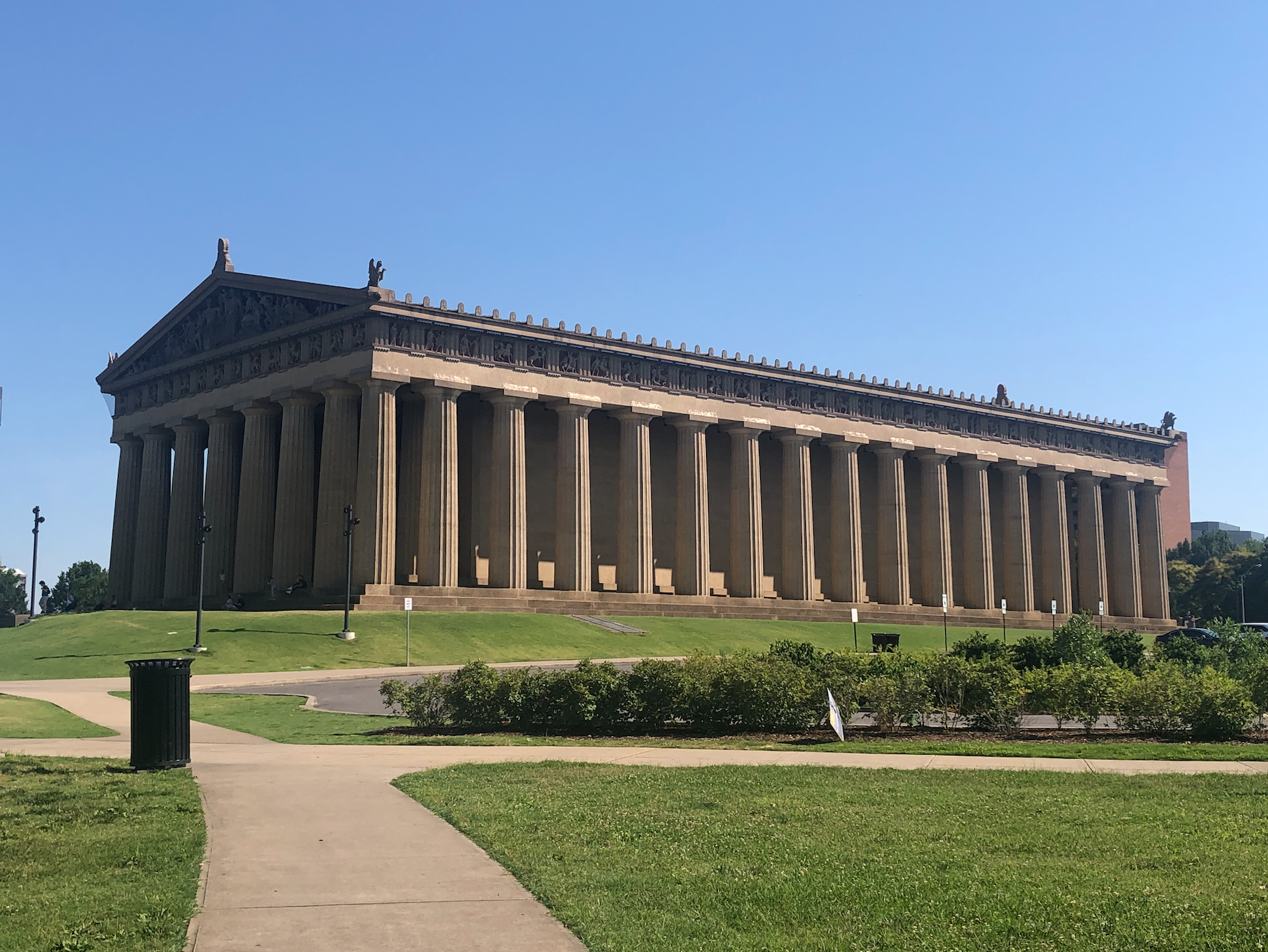
The Parthenon in Nashville

== Career ==
After the war, Smith was an architect in Nashville, Tennessee. In 1874, he designed the Main Building of Vanderbilt University, later known as Kirkland Hall, as two French Gothic towers. The building burned down in a fire in 1905, and it was later rebuilt with only one tower.

Smith designed the Collier-Crichlow House in Murfreesboro, Tennessee in 1880 for Ingram Banks Collier III, who served as the mayor of Murfreesboro from 1872 to 1873. It was listed on the National Register of Historic Places on July 16, 1973.

Smith was commissioned to design the Masonic Temple in Columbia, Tennessee in 1883. A decade later, in 1893, Smith designed the Colemere Mansion in Nashville for Confederate Colonel Edmund William Cole, who served as the President of the Nashville, Chattanooga and St. Louis Railway after the war. The house burned down in October 1929. Meanwhile, Smith designed Memorial Hall on the campus of Cumberland University in Lebanon, Tennessee, built from 1892 to 1896.

Additionally, Smith was commissioned to two buildings in Downtown Nashville in 1893: a four-storey building on the corner of Printer's Alley and Church Street and a five-story building at 317 North College Street. He was also commissioned to restore a three-story building at 315 North College Street.

Meanwhile, in 1897, Smith designed The Parthenon in Centennial Park.

Smith quit his architectural career to serve in the Philippine–American War, where he commanded the 1st Tennessee Infantry Regiment of the United States Army in 1898–1899. Following his death from apoplexy in battle, he was succeeded as Colonel of the 1st Tennessee Volunteer Infantry Regiment by Francis Gracey Childers.

== Personal life ==
Smith was married. They had several children, including a son, George J. Smith, who also served in the Philippine–American War, and a daughter, who married Hart B. Blanton.

Smith was a Knight Templar.

== Death and legacy ==
Smith died of heat exhaustion during the Battle of Manila February 5, 1899, in the Philippines. His body was shipped back to San Francisco, California, where it received a Masonic service. Shortly after, his body was returned to Nashville, where it lay in the Nashville Masonic Temple, followed by a service in the Tabernacle. He was buried on April 19, 1899, at the Mount Olivet Cemetery.

In 1903, an honorary plaque from the Nashville Red Cross Society was installed inside the Parthenon. The ceremony was attended by Benton McMillin, who served as the governor of Tennessee from 1899 to 1903.

The Parthenon has been listed on the National Register of Historic Places in Davidson County since February 23, 1972. Memorial Hall has been listed on the National Register of Historic Places in Wilson County since April 29, 1977. Meanwhile, one of Smith's apprentices, Clarence Kelley Colley, went on to become a renowned architect in his own right, with buildings listed on the National Register of Historic Places.
