= Daniel Diermeier =

American economist

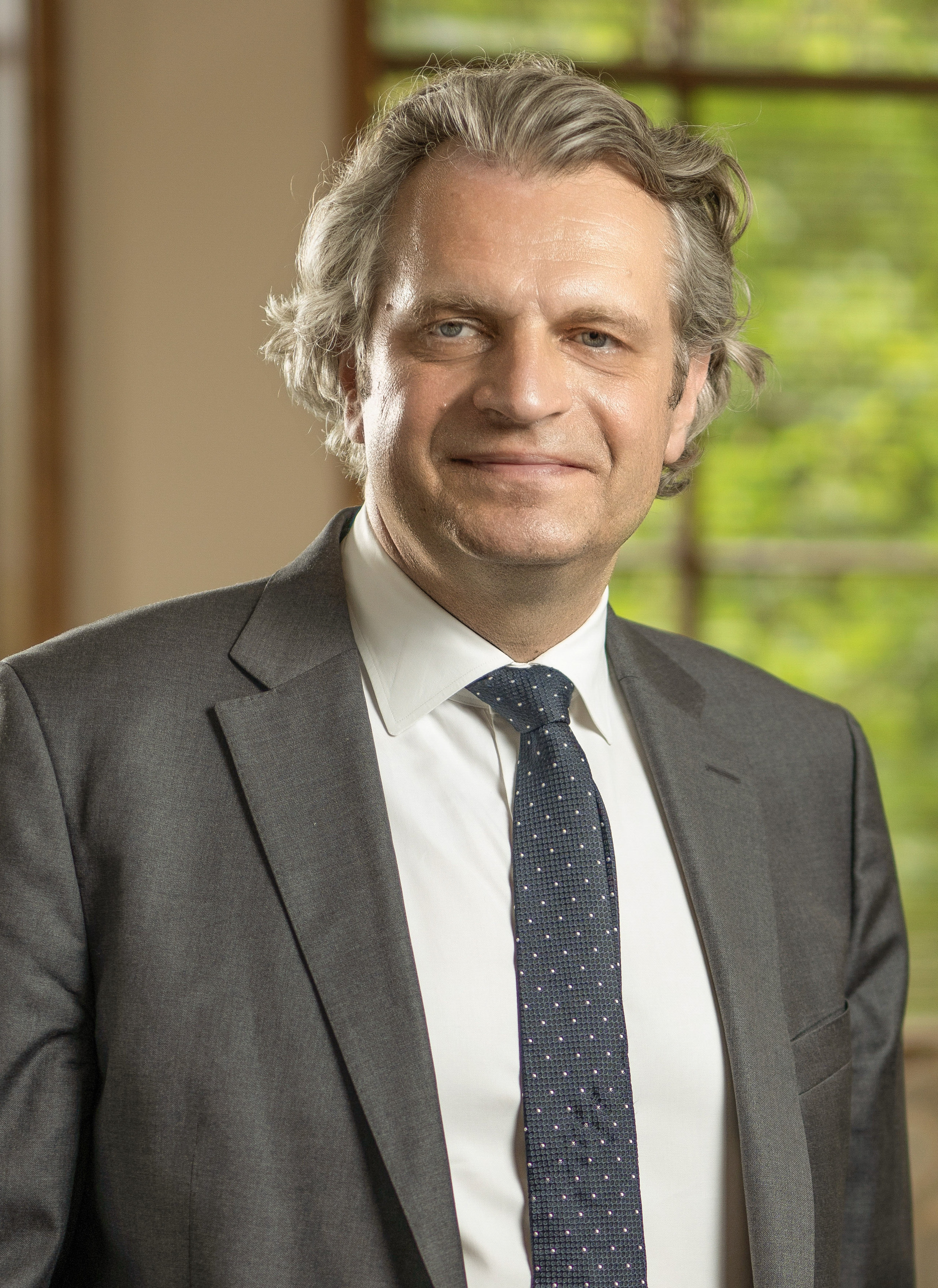
- Diermeier in 2020

9th Chancellor of Vanderbilt University
- Incumbent
- Assumed office July 1, 2020
- Preceded by: Nicholas S. Zeppos

Provost of the University of Chicago
- In office July 1, 2016 – January 31, 2020
- Preceded by: Eric Isaacs
- Succeeded by: Ka Yee Lee

Dean of the Harris School of Public Policy
- In office September 1, 2014 – July 1, 2016
- Preceded by: Colm O'Muircheartaigh
- Succeeded by: Kerwin Kofi Charles (acting)

Personal details
- Born: July 16, 1965 (age 61) West Berlin, West Germany
- Children: 2
- Education: LMU Munich (BA, MA); University of Southern California (MA); University of Rochester (MA, PhD)

Daniel Diermeier (born July 16, 1965) is a German political scientist, management scholar, and university administrator. He currently serves as the 9th chancellor of Vanderbilt University since July 2020. Previously, Diermeier was the David Lee Shillinglaw Distinguished Service Professor at the University of Chicago, where he also served as provost from 2016 to 2020.

== Education ==
Diermeier holds a Ph.D. in political science from the University of Rochester and master's degrees from LMU Munich, the University of Southern California, and the University of Rochester.

== Career ==
Educated at German and American universities, Diermeier started his career as an assistant professor at the Graduate School of Business at Stanford University before joining the Department of Managerial Economics and Decision Sciences at Northwestern University's Kellogg School of Management. There, he was the IBM Professor of Regulation and Competitive Practice and, later, director of the Ford Motor Company Center for Global Citizenship. He won multiple teaching awards, including the Professor of the Year Award in 2010 and Alumni Professor of the Year Award in 2013.

From 2014 to 2016, Diermeier served as Dean of the Harris School of Public Policy as well as the Emmet Dedmon Professor at the Harris School and The College at The University of Chicago. During his tenure the Harris School increased the number of students and faculty, expanded key areas of scholarly research, and led fundraising efforts for the renovation of The Keller Center. As provost of the University of Chicago, Diermeier earned a yearly salary of $1,319,597.

On December 4, 2019, Diermeier was announced as the ninth Chancellor of Vanderbilt University, beginning July 1, 2020, and was officially invested on April 9, 2022. In May 2024, the university extended Diermeier's contract until 2035.

On July 1, 2026, the Nashville Area Chamber of Commerce elected Diermeier as Chair of the Board for the 2026-2028 term.

Diermeier is a member of the American Academy of Arts and Sciences and a research fellow at the Canadian Institute of Advanced Research (CIFAR). In 2014, he was awarded a Guggenheim Fellowship in political science.

In 2023, Diermeier was named by Carnegie Corporation of New York as an honoree of the Great Immigrants Awards.

== Chancellor of Vanderbilt University ==
Diermeier was appointed chancellor at Vanderbilt in 2020 during the coronavirus pandemic. He instituted a return to in-person classes for the Fall 2020 semester.

Diermeier’s administration has also expanded access to Opportunity Vanderbilt, a student financial aid program, to fully cover tuition for undergraduate students whose families earn less than US$150,000 a year.

=== Higher Education Reform ===
Diermeier has been considered a leader of a group of university officials who are dedicated to reform in higher education, advocating for free speech and civil discourse on campus. In 2024, Diermeier introduced a new Statement of Principles calling for Vanderbilt to reject political ideology and advocacy for social change as part of its institutional operations. This is a continuation of Diermeier and Vanderbilt’s position of "principled neutrality" by not taking official positions on matters that are not central to the university, a stance praised by Lamar Alexander.

Diermeier's positions on conflict in the Middle East, including his refusal to have Vanderbilt divest from Israeli companies and the university's response to campus protests, have drawn criticism from some faculty, students, and alumni.

=== Growth and Expansion ===
Diermeier’s tenure has seen the establishment of the Vanderbilt Institute of National Security, focused on studying evolving national security threats and training students for national security careers, as well as the creation of Vanderbilt’s College of Connected Computing, the university’s first new college in more than 40 years.Vanderbilt University initiated plans to expand to campuses beyond Tennessee during Chancellor Diermeier’s tenure, with plans for expansions to West Palm Beach, Florida, New York City, Chattanooga, and San Francisco, California announced in a two-year span from 2024 to 2026. In September 2025, Diermeier oversaw the finalization of an agreement to open a campus on the site of a former seminary in Manhattan’s Chelsea neighborhood, which will offer a semester-long residential program for about 100 undergraduate students and a graduate program for business and technology. Vanderbilt University also completed a deal to acquire land for a campus in West Palm Beach, Florida, which is expected to employ 100 faculty for an annual enrollment of 1,000 students. In January 2026, Vanderbilt announced plans to establish an academic campus in San Francisco scheduled to open in 2027. The expansion follows Vanderbilt’s acquisition of the campus previously occupied by the California College of the Arts, which is set to close operations in 2027.

=== Athletics ===
Vanderbilt athletics have undergone significant growth under Diermeier, with hundreds of millions of dollars invested in facility renovations and talent, including the appointment of Athletic Director Candice Storey Lee. Diermeier also oversaw the creation of a strategic initiative, Vanderbilt Enterprises, to enhance athletics revenue and fan experiences.

== Research ==
Diermeier has published four books and more than 100 research articles in academic journals, mostly in the fields of political science, economics and management, but also in other areas ranging from linguistics, sociology, and psychology to computer science, operations research, and applied mathematics.

Diermeier has contributed to the theory of legislative institutions, including the study of committees in the U.S. Congress, governing coalitions in multi-party democracies and the formation and stability of coalition governments. He was one of the first political scientists to use structural estimation: i.e., in the study of political careers and coalitions; text analytical methods; and behavioral models in politics. In addition to his work in political science Diermeier has worked on issues of corporation reputations and the interaction between firms and social activists.

== Other interests ==
Diermeier has served as a board member for the University of Chicago Medical Center, Argonne National Laboratory, the Civic Consulting Alliance, CityBase, the Marine Biological Laboratory, the National Opinion Research Center, the Field Museum of Natural History, and the management board of the Federal Bureau of Investigation. He also has been an advisor to governments, nonprofit organizations, and leading corporations, including Abbott, Accenture, Allianz, the City of Chicago, the Government of Canada, Ernst & Young, Exelon, the FBI, Hyatt, Johnson & Johnson, Medtronic, Metro Group, PricewaterhouseCoopers, State Farm, UnitedHealth Group, and the United States Olympic and Paralympic Committee.

== Personal life ==
Diermeier was born and grew up in West Berlin and was living there during the fall of the Berlin Wall. He was the first in his family to go to college.

Diermeier was married to Ariela Lazar in 1997. As of March 23, 2023 a petition for dissolution of marriage case was filed by Ariela Lazar, against Daniel Diermeier, in the jurisdiction of Cook County, Illinois. The case is pending as of May 2026.

== Publications ==
- Abito, J.M., Besanko, D., and Diermeier, D. (2019). Corporate Social Responsibility, Reputation and Private Politics: The Strategic Interaction between Activists and Firms. New York, NY: Oxford University Press.
- Diermeier, D. (2011). Reputation Rules: Strategies for Building Your Company’s Most Valuable Asset. New York, NY: McGraw-Hill.
- Bendor, J., Diermeier, D., Siegel, D. A., Ting, M. M. (2011). A Behavioral Theory of Elections. Princeton, NJ: Princeton University Press.
- Diermeier, D., & Feddersen, T.J. (1998). Cohesion in legislatures and the Vote of Confidence procedure. American Political Science Review, 92(3), 611-621.
- Diermeier, D., & Myerson, R.B. (1999). Bicameralism and its consequences for the internal organization of legislatures. American Economic Review, 89(5), 1182-1196.
- Baron, D., & Diermeier, D. (2001). Elections, governments, and parliaments in proportional representation systems. Quarterly Journal of Economics, 116(3), 933-967
- Diermeier, D., Eraslan, H., & Merlo, A. (2003). A structural model of government formation. Econometrica, 71(1), 27-70.
- Diermeier, D., Keane, M., & Merlo, A. (2005). A political economy model of congressional careers. American Economic Review, 95(1), 347-373.
- Baron, D., & Diermeier, D. (2007). Strategic activism and non-market strategy. Journal of Economics and Management Strategy, 16(3), 599-634.
- Beigman-Klebanov, B., Beigman, E., & Diermeier, D. (2008). Lexical cohesion analysis of political speech. Political Analysis, 16(4): 447-463.
- Diermeier, D., Egorov, G., and Sonin, K. (2017). Political Economy of Redistribution. Econometrica. 85(3):851-70.
