= Landon Garland =

American academic

Landon C. Garland
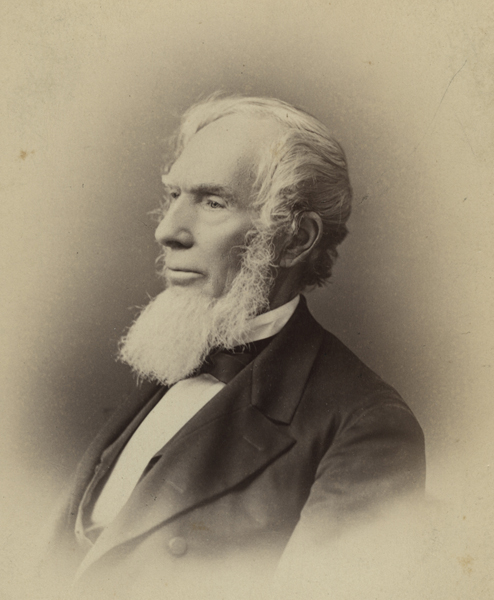
- Portrait of Chancellor Landon C. Garland

1st Chancellor of Vanderbilt University
- In office 1875–1893
- Succeeded by: James Hampton Kirkland

President of the University of Alabama
- In office 1855–1865

2nd President of Randolph-Macon College
- In office 1836–1846
- Preceded by: Stephen Olin
- Succeeded by: William Andrew Smith

Personal details
- Born: March 21, 1810 Nelson County, Virginia, US
- Died: February 13, 1895 (aged 84) Nashville, Tennessee, U.S.
- Resting place: Vanderbilt Divinity School Cemetery, Nashville, Tennessee
- Spouse: Louisa Frances Garland
- Children: Annie Rose Garland Fulton; Carrie Matilda Garland Thompson; Alice Virginia Garland; Louise Frances Garland
- Parent(s): Alexander Spotswood Garland, Lucinda Rose Garland
- Relatives: Hugh A. Garland, (brother), James Madison, (great-uncle), Samuel Garland, Jr., (nephew)
- Education: Hampden–Sydney College (BA)

Landon Cabell Garland (1810–1895), an American, was professor of physics and history and university president three times at different Southern Universities (Randolph Macon, Alabama, Vanderbilt) while living in the Southern United States for his entire life. He served as the second president of Randolph–Macon College in Ashland, Virginia, from 1836 to 1846; then professor from 1847 to 1855, and then third president of the University of Alabama in Tuscaloosa, Alabama, from 1855 to 1867; and first chancellor of Vanderbilt University in Nashville, Tennessee, from 1875 to 1893. He was an apologist for slavery in the United States before the Civil War, but afterward became a vociferous spokesperson against slavery.

== Early life ==
Landon Garland was born March 21, 1810, in Nelson County, Virginia. He graduated with first honors from Hampden–Sydney College in 1829. His older brother, Hugh A. Garland, who was one of the lawyers involved in the Dred Scott case and author of a biography of John Randolph of Roanoke, was also a Hampden-Sydney graduate. Their parents were Alexander Spotswood Garland and Lucinda Rose. Confederate Army General Samuel Garland, Jr. was the son of his only sister, Caroline Garland (1807–1901), and United States Founding Father and fourth President of the United States James Madison was his great uncle.

== Career ==
Garland taught chemistry and natural philosophy at Washington College in Lexington, Virginia, from 1829 to 1830.

Garland taught chemistry and natural history at Randolph-Macon College in Ashland, Virginia, from 1833 to 1834, eventually being elected chair of the department. From 1836 to 1846, he served as the second president of Randolph-Macon College.

Garland moved to the University of Alabama in Tuscaloosa, Alabama, in 1847, where he taught English literature, rhetoric, and history. He served as its third president from 1857 to 1867 (the university campus was destroyed in the last days of the Civil War in the spring of 1865). Concerned about a lack of discipline among students, he tried to turn it into a military institution. At the end of the American Civil War of 1861–1865; the University of Alabama campus was burned to the ground by Union cavalry forces in the same week in 1865 that the Civil War was effectively ended by Johnson's surrender in South Carolina of the southern command's Confederacy forces.

After a year of trying to rebuild the university, Garland's dream of making it an institution of discipline and honor (a central theme of the historical south) died along with the Confederacy. Only a single student enrolled for classes in 1866; Garland resigned and accepted the chair of philosophy and astronomy at the University of Mississippi in 1867. There, Methodist Bishop Holland Nimmons McTyeire (1824–1889) sought out his former teacher and enlisted him in the campaign to build a Methodist university in Nashville, Tennessee. Garland, a highly respected academic in Southern education and in Methodism, wrote essay after essay in church publications on the need for an "educated ministry". With Garland on board, the bishop now needed the money, and for that he turned to Commodore Cornelius Vanderbilt. Garland became chancellor of Vanderbilt University in 1875.

Garland had definite ideas about the rules that would govern the university's place in this world. Under Garland's plan, Vanderbilt would have four departments: Biblical Studies and Literature, Science and Philosophy, Law, and Medical. Though Bishop McTyeire usually was there looking over his shoulder, Chancellor Garland clearly set the mood of the campus. Steeped in Scottish moral philosophy, he believed that the development of character was the central purpose of a true university. He did his part to mold character each Wednesday when he preached sermons to the student body in chapel, and he was staunch in his opposition to dormitories, claiming they were "injurious to both morals and manners."

In the early days, the closest thing to campus radicals were the law students. In fact, the law students provided the first challenge to the chancellor over the concept of an open forum. Garland had invited John Sherman (1823–1900), brother of Gen. William Tecumseh Sherman (1820–1891), to address the students in chapel. For the law students, it was more than they could bear to sit through a speech by the brother of the Yankee general who had burned a wide swath from Atlanta to the sea. The law students held a protest meeting, then marched single file out of the building, some playing Dixie on their harmonicas.

In 1889, Bishop McTyeire died. Two years later, in 1891, Garland tendered his resignation to the board of trustees, but they kept it in abeyance until 1893 when the board named James Hampton Kirkland (1798–1868) as chancellor.

== Views on slavery ==
Garland enslaved "up to 60" people before the Civil War; the first few were given to his bride and him by their parents as marriage gifts. Later, he purchased slaves as families (he claimed to keep them together), but also as source of income by then renting them as house servants to others (again, claiming he did so to also keep them relatively safe). Moreover, "he claimed that he did not own them as property, but he instead owned their labor." In this "ownership" claim, he was employing a classic pro-slavery stance - making a distinction without a difference between "owning the person and owning their work product." There is nothing in Garland's writings from before or during the Civil War to suggest that he was anything other than a pro-slavery advocate.

Garland gave a pro-slavery lecture in Tuscaloosa in 1860 where he said, "The negro has, through slavery, been taken up from a condition of grossest barbarity and ignorance, made serviceable to himself and to the world, and elevated and improved socially, morally, intellectually, and physically." This idea - that enslaved people were better off enslaved in the United States than free in Africa - was a tenet of pro-slavery thought. During the Civil War, Garland doubled-down on his pro-slavery ideology, writing to the Governor of Alabama about his fears of former slaves being organized "into bands of midnight assassins" by the United States army following the Emancipation Proclamation. He believed that ending slavery would result in "midnight Conflagrations of our houses and the butchery of our wives and children," a classic white supremacist fantasy. To prevent these imagined attacks, Garland advised moving all enslaved men aged between 15 and 60 into holding areas "far in the interior" of the state "where they may be guarded by comparatively few soldiers, & if necessary marched out of the reach of Lincoln's troopes." Of course, when he recognized that if the U.S. Army advanced that they would be met by "slaves flocking" to their lines, Garland was acknowledging enslaved people's desires for freedom and the fact that enslaved people were more than able to seize freedom themselves.

== Personal life ==
Garland was married to Louisa Frances. They had several children, including:

- Annie Rose Garland Fulton (1843–1893). She married Robert Burwell Fulton (1849–1919), who served as the seventh chancellor of the University of Mississippi from 1892 to 1906; they had two sons and one daughter who died in infancy and one son who survived: Maurice Garland Fulton (1877–1955; professor of English and history at New Mexico Military Institute in Roswell, New Mexico)
- maybe Carrie Matilda Garland Thompson (1852–1880)
- Alice Virginia Garland (1856–1872)
- Lucinda Rose Garland Lewis: She married Burwell Boykin Lewis, Confederate cavalry officer, lawyer, and congressman from Alabama, who was also a president of the University of Alabama; they had seven daughters, including Bertha Lewis Miller, who married Hugh Barr Miller, and whose son, Hugh Barr Miller, Jr, is considered an important figure during WWII
- Louise Frances Garland: She married Milton W. Humphreys (1844–1928), who had been recruited by Garland as the first professor of Greek and Latin at Vanderbilt University.

Garland died on February 13, 1895, in Nashville. He was buried alongside Bishops McTyeire, Joshua Soule, and William McKendree in a fenced grave in the Vanderbilt University Divinity Cemetery.

== Legacy ==
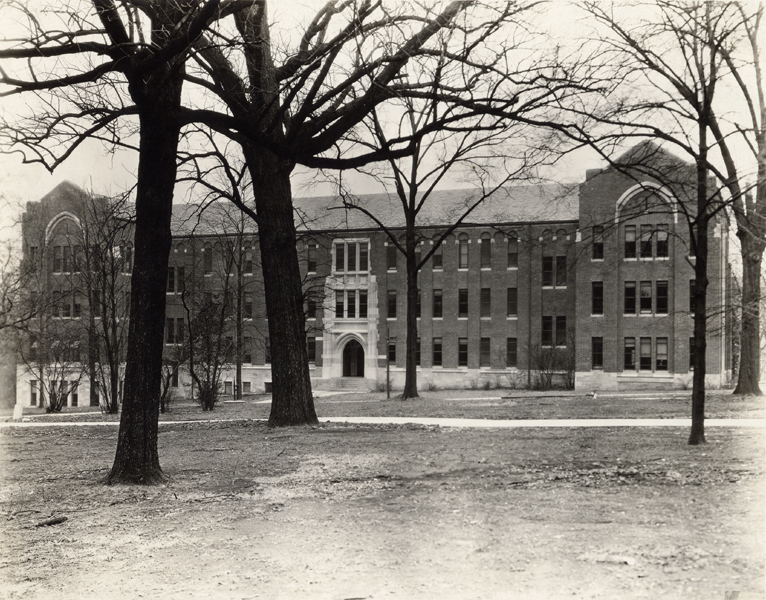
Garland Hall on the campus of Vanderbilt University

His papers, the Landon Cabell Garland Papers, 1830–1893, include correspondence, diaries, speeches, sermons, a report to the Vanderbilt University Board of Trust, and personal and biographical materials. The collection is small, only 1/3 of a cubic foot. These are personal papers of Chancellor Garland and are not to be confused with his university papers, which are housed in the University Archives. This collection provides a small snapshot of Chancellor Garland's personal life, with the family correspondence providing the main interest.

Garland Hall on the Vanderbilt University campus is named in his honor. Also, Landon Cabell Garland Hall on the University of Alabama campus is named after him, as is a dorm at Randolph-Macon College.

His portrait, painted by great-granddaughter Louise Lewis in 1907–1908, hangs in a family home in Tuscaloosa, Alabama. Copies painted by Louise Lewis of the original hang in Kirkland Hall on the Vanderbilt University campus and in the archives of the University of Alabama.

== Bibliography ==
=== Secondary sources ===
- Louise Dowlen, Alfred Leland Crabb, Landon Cabell Garland: The Prince of Southern Educators (Nashville, Tennessee: Vanderbilt University Press, 1938, 41 pages).

Academic offices
| Preceded by Stephen Olin | President of Randolph-Macon College; 1836 – 1846 | Succeeded by William Andrew Smith |
| Preceded by Basil Manly, Sr. | President of the University of Alabama; 1855 – 1865 | Succeeded by William Russell Smith |
| Preceded by - | Chancellor of Vanderbilt University; 1875 – 1893 | Succeeded by James Hampton Kirkland |
