= Louise Branscomb =

American physician

Louise Hortense Branscomb
- Born: March 25, 1901; Birmingham, Alabama
- Died: June 16, 1999 (aged 98); Birmingham, Alabama
- Education: Huntingdon College; Johns Hopkins University School of Medicine
- Occupations: Gynecologist, surgeon
- Father: Lewis C. Branscomb
- Military career
- Allegiance: United States
- Branch: United States Public Health Service
- Service years: 1944-1945
- Rank: Major
- Conflicts: World War II

Louise Branscomb (March 25, 1901 – June 16, 1999) was an American physician and surgeon specializing in obstetrics and gynecology who practiced in Birmingham, Alabama. She also served as a major in World War II as part of the United States Public Health Service.

== Early life and education ==
Branscomb was born in Birmingham, Alabama on March 25, 1901. She received her Bachelor of Arts from Huntingdon College and earned her medical degree from Johns Hopkins University School of Medicine in 1928. Branscomb interned for 3 years at 3 different hospitals: Women's Memorial Hospital in Baltimore, the Philadelphia Women's Hospital in Philadelphia, and Franklin Square Hospital in Baltimore.

== Career ==
In 1931, Branscomb opened her private practice for obstetrics and gynecology, becoming one of the first female physicians in Birmingham. She recalls only earning $4 in the first month and was forced to borrow money to pay rent. Branscomb also was a practicing surgeon, which was a "rare specialty for female physicians of her time". In her practice, she encountered resistance from patient's husbands and the local hospital, Hillman Hospital, which didn't have any women on staff. As her private practice grew, she was unable to find a partnering doctor, as most male physicians at the time "were not interested in a partnership with a woman" doctor. She also recognized that most of her patients sought her out because they wanted a female doctor, and would not prefer a male substitute.

From 1938 to 1947, Branscomb taught sociology at Birmingham–Southern College. In 1944, she stepped away from her private practice and teaching to serve in World War II as part of the United States Public Health Service. Serving as a major, she was stationed with the United Nations Relief and Rehabilitation Administration and performed as an obstetrician at a refugee camp in the Middle East.

Branscomb returned to Birmingham in 1945 and resumed her medical practice. She served on the Methodist Board of Missions from 1964 to 1972 and the United Methodist Commission on the Status and Role of Women from 1973 to 1982. Branscomb retired as a practicing doctor in 1975.

== Death and leagacy ==
Branscomb died on June 16, 1999 in Birmingham. She donated her papers to Duke University and left over $6M to Birmingham Southern College and other organizations.

=== Awards and honors ===
- In 1941, received the Huntingdon College Alumnae Achievement Award for being "one of five women in the United States invited to join the American College of Surgeons"
- In 1962, named "Altrusan of the Year" in honor of her dedication to helping others
- In 1975, named "Woman of the Year" by the North Alabama United Methodist Conference
- In 1986, the United Methodist Women named her as one of 100 outstanding Methodist women of the year
- In 2003, named to the Alabama Women's Hall of Fame
