= Milton W. Humphreys =

American scholar (1844–1928)

- Born: Milton Wylie Humphreys; September 15, 1844; Greenbrier County, Virginia (now West Virginia)
- Died: November 20, 1928 (aged 84); Charlottesville, Virginia
- Resting place: University of Virginia Cemetery
- Education: Mercer Academy; Washington and Lee University; University of Leipzig
- Occupations: Greek scholar, university professor
- Spouse: Louise Frances Garland
- Children: 4
- Parent(s): Andrew Cavet Humphreys; Mary McQuain (Hefner) Humphreys

Milton Wylie Humphreys (September 15, 1844 – November 20, 1928) was an American Confederate sergeant during the American Civil War of 1861-1865 and an early scholar of Ancient Greek and Latin in the United States. He was the first professor to introduce the Roman pronunciation of Latin in the United States while teaching at Washington and Lee University. Additionally, he was the first Professor of Latin and Greek at Vanderbilt University and the University of Texas at Austin. He spent the rest of his career at the University of Virginia. He also served as the President of the American Philological Association in 1882–1883.

== Biography ==
=== Early life ===
Milton Wylie Humphreys was born on September 15, 1844, in Greenbrier County, West Virginia, when it was still part of Virginia. His father was Andrew Cavet Humphreys and his mother, Mary McQuain (Hefner) Humphreys. He was raised as a Presbyterian. He was educated at the Mercer Academy in Charleston, West Virginia. He then attended Washington and Lee University in Lexington, Virginia (then known as Washington College), but he dropped out to join the war efforts. Shortly after the war, he taught school. He returned to Washington and Lee, and finally received a master's degree in 1869. He then received a PhD from the University of Leipzig in Leipzig, Germany.

=== Civil War ===
During the American Civil War of 1861–1865, he served as a sergeant in the Thirteenth Virginia Light Artillery and Bryan's Battery of the Confederate States Army. Most of his combat operations took place in West Virginia. On May 19, 1862, in Fayetteville, West Virginia, he set a precedent for modern warfare by firing an indirect cannon missile. He was paroled on June 12, 1865, in Charleston, West Virginia. He later became an expert on gunnery and ballistics.

=== Career ===
After the war, he returned to Washington and Lee to teach Greek and Latin. Specifically, he served as associate professor of Latin and Greek from 1867 to 1870, and as adjunct professor of Ancient Languages under General Robert E. Lee (1807–1870) from 1870 to 1875. He insisted upon the Roman pronunciation of Latin, making Washington and Lee the first American university where this was the case.

He was then asked by Chancellor Landon Garland (1810–1895) to become the first professor of Greek at Vanderbilt University in Nashville, Tennessee, a newly formed university, which he accepted. He was officially on the faculty role in 1875. He designed the curriculum, as well as the requirements for admission and graduation. Before he left Vanderbilt, he received the first honorary degree ever given by the university.

From 1883 to 1887, he served as the first professor of Greek and Latin at the University of Texas at Austin in Austin. However, his research during his time in Austin was very much hampered by a lack of books available, as the university had just been established. According to Edwin Mims (1872–1959), who served as chairman of the English Department at Vanderbilt University from 1912 to 1942, Humphreys was sickened to find out that Tadeusz Stefan Zieliński (1859–1944) has already published a volume on research he had been doing for years. As a result, he had no choice but to review Zielinski's book for the American Journal of Philology.

In 1887, he went to teach at the University of Virginia in Charlottesville, Virginia, where he spent the rest of his career. He retired on September 12, 1915.

He was the editor of the Revue des Revues from 1878 to 1888 and translated several Greek texts. He served as a commissioner to Weltausstellung 1873 Wien, a world fair in Vienna, Austria, in 1873. In 1882, he served as president of the American Philological Association. In 1926, he published his Civil War memoirs.

=== Personal life and death ===
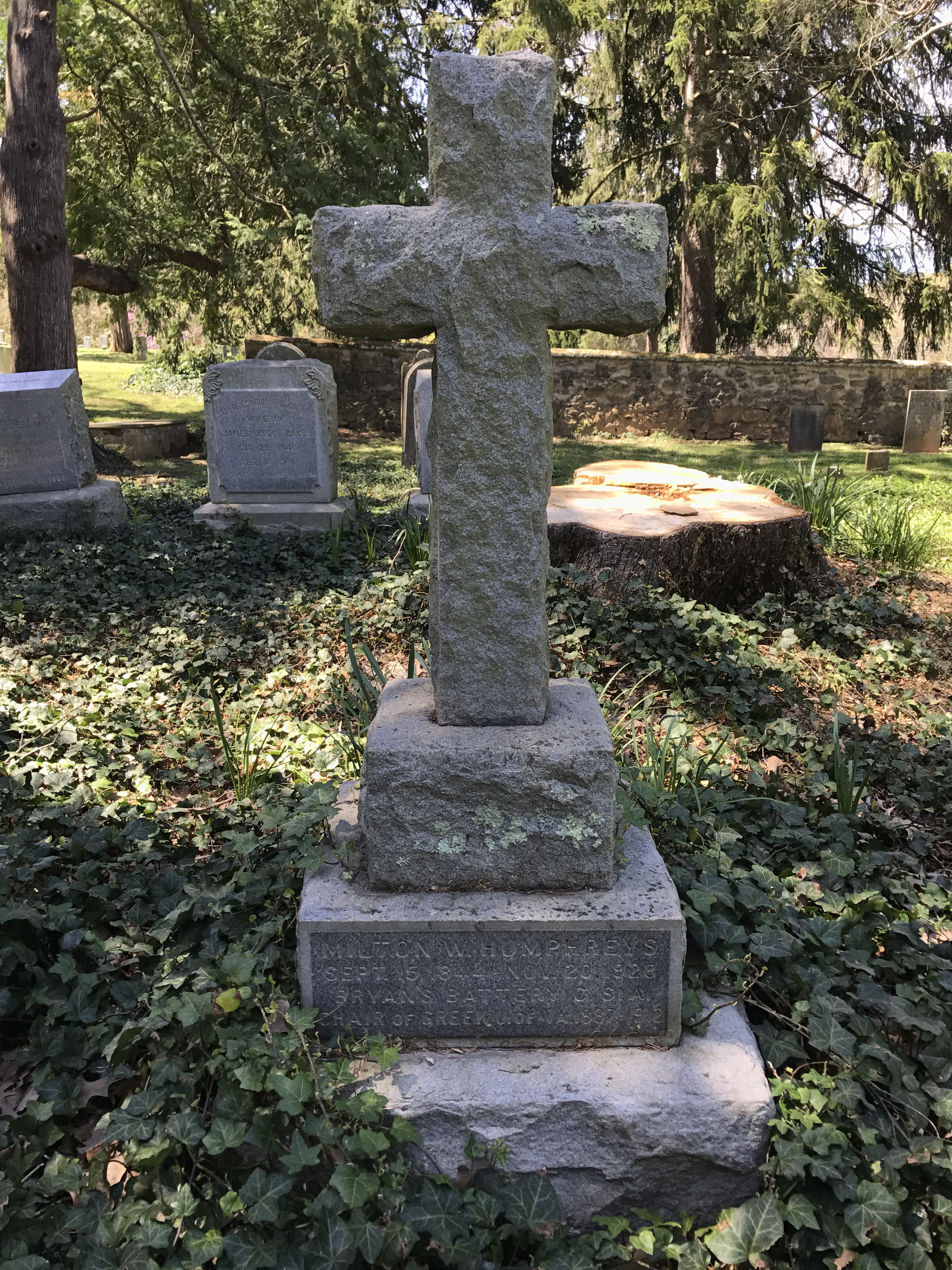
Humphreys's gravestone at the University of Virginia Cemetery in Charlottesville, Virginia

On May 3, 1877, he married Louise Frances Garland, the daughter of Landon Garland (1810–1895), the chancellor of Vanderbilt University, who had recruited him. They had four children.

He died on November 20, 1928, in Charlottesville, Virginia. He was buried in the University of Virginia Cemetery.

== Bibliography ==
=== Works ===
- Autobiography: Typed Excerpts Pertaining to Washington and Lee University (1860).
- Quaestiones metricae de accentus momento in versu heroico (1874, 30 pages).
- On Negative Commands in Greek (1876, 4 pages).
- On Certain Influences of Accent in Latin Iambic Trimeters (1876; 39 pages).
- Elision: Especially in Greek (1878, 14 pages).
- On Certain Effects of Elision (1879).
- On the Nature of Caesura (1879, 7 pages).
- A Contribution to Infantile Linguistic (1880, 13 pages).
- Aristophanes: Butt (1885)
- The Antigone of Sophocles (1891)
- On the Equivalence of Rhythmical Bars and Metrical Feet (1892, 177 pages).
- Demosthenes on the Crown (with introduction and notes, 1913, 306 pages).
- Hephaestion and Irrationality (1915).
- A History of the Lynchburg Campaign (1924, 74 pages).
- Military Operations 1861–1863 at Fayetteville, West Virginia (1926; 1932, 103 pages).
- Anthony, the White Man's Friend: How a Greenbrier Stream and Cave Became Lasting Memorials to a Friendly Indian (1927, 6 pages).
- Influence of Accent in Latin Dactylic Hexameters (22 pages).
- Thucydides and Geometry (4 pages).

=== Secondary source ===
- Joseph R. Barrigan, Southern Humanities Review (Volume 10, 1977).
