= Lewis C. Branscomb =

Lewis Capers Branscomb
- Born: August 27, 1865; Union Springs, Alabama, U.S.
- Died: October 30, 1930 (aged 65); Jasper, Alabama, U.S.
- Education: Birmingham–Southern College; Emory University
- Children: 7, including Harvie Branscomb
- Relatives: Lewis M. Branscomb (grandson)

Lewis C. Branscomb (August 27, 1865- October 30, 1930) was an American Methodist minister in the U.S. state of Alabama, and the president of the Alabama Anti-Saloon League.

== Early life ==
Branscomb was born in 1865 in Union Springs, Alabama. He graduated from Southern University, later known as Birmingham–Southern College, and Emory University, and he was a member of Sigma Alpha Epsilon. He was ordained as a minister of the Methodist Episcopal Church, South in 1886.

== Career ==
Branscomb was a Methodist minister in Anniston, Bessemer, Birmingham, Decatur, Huntsville, and Talladega. He was especially associated with the First Methodist Church of Birmingham, Alabama. Branscomb was the editor of the Alabama Christian Advocate from 1916 to 1922. Additionally, he served on the boards of the Federated Churches of Christ and the Methodist Orphanage of Troy, Alabama.

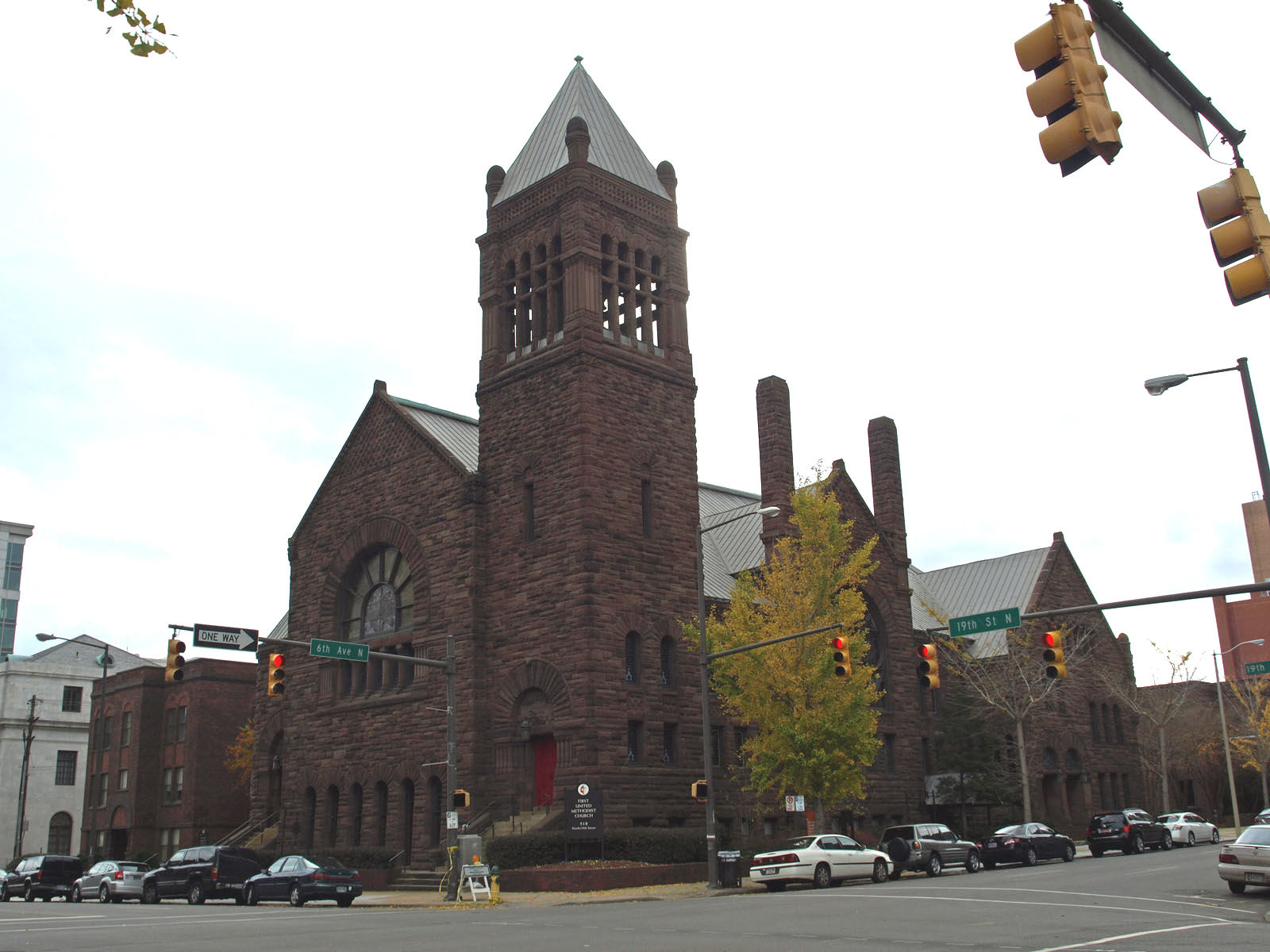
The First Methodist Church of Birmingham, Alabama, where Branscomb was the minister.

Branscomb served on the executive committee of the board of directors of the Anti-Saloon League; he was also the president of its Alabama chapter. He served on the boards of trustees of the Woman's College of Alabama, now known as Huntingdon College, and Birmingham–Southern College.

== Death and legacy ==
Branscomb died on October 30, 1930, in Jasper, Alabama. He had suffered from injuries in a car accident on October 15, and failed to recover. On Founders' Day in 1931, Branscomb was honored at Huntingdon College.

One of Branscomb's sons, Harvie Branscomb, became a university administrator while his grandson Lewis M. Branscomb became a physicist. Another one of Branscomb's sons Edwin Branscomb became a minister in the Methodist Episcopal Church, South. One of his daughters, Louise H. Branscomb, became a medical doctor and was inducted into the Alabama Women's Hall of Fame.
