= Harvie Branscomb =

American academic

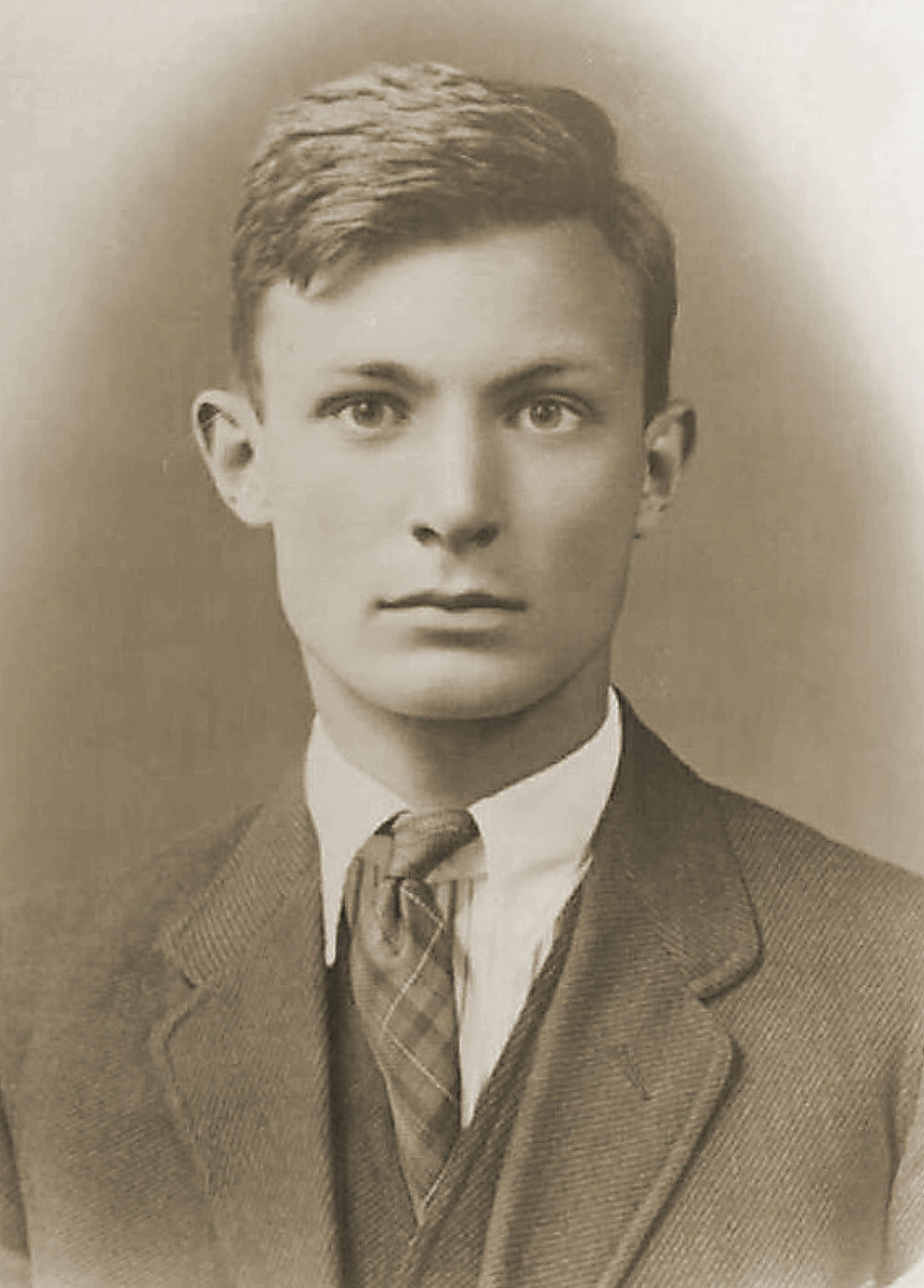
- Branscomb in around 1914

4th Chancellor of Vanderbilt University
- In office 1946–1963
- Preceded by: Oliver Carmichael
- Succeeded by: G. Alexander Heard

Personal details
- Born: December 25, 1894 Huntsville, Alabama, U.S.
- Died: July 23, 1998 (aged 103) Nashville, Tennessee, U.S.
- Spouse: Margaret Vaughan
- Children: 3 sons, including Lewis M. Branscomb and Ben Vaughan Branscomb
- Education: Birmingham–Southern College (BA); Wadham College, Oxford (BA); Columbia University (PhD)

Bennett Harvie Branscomb (December 25, 1894 – July 23, 1998) was an American theologian and academic administrator. He served as the fourth chancellor of Vanderbilt University, a private university in Nashville, Tennessee, from 1946 to 1963. Prior to his appointment at Vanderbilt, he was the director of the Duke University Libraries and dean of the Duke Divinity School. Additionally, he served as a professor of Christian theology at Southern Methodist University. He was the author of several books about New Testament theology.

== Early life ==
Branscomb was born on December 25, 1894, in Huntsville, Alabama. His father, Lewis C. Branscomb, was a Methodist minister and the president of the Alabama Anti-Saloon League. His mother was Nancy McAdory.

Branscomb earned a Bachelor of Arts degree from Birmingham–Southern College in 1914. He was a Rhodes Scholar at the University of Oxford's Wadham College, where he earned another Bachelor of Arts degree in 1917 and a distinguished master's degree in biblical studies, receiving a coveted Greek prize and First Honors in Theology. He joined the United States Army and was stationed at Camp Gordon during World War I, and he earned a PhD from Columbia University in 1924.

While a student at Oxford during WWI, Branscomb was a student volunteer with the Commission for Relief in Belgium. Through German lines, Branscomb and fellow student Oliver Carmichael smuggled a politically sensitive letter from Cardinal Mercier to Belgian priests recounting the killing of priests and urging resistance to the German invasion. The students hid the letter in a newspaper as they approached the German checkpoint. As Carmichael was searched by the guards, Branscomb discretely set the newspaper on a table behind him. Then as Branscomb was searched, Carmichael casually picked up the paper as the two were cleared and left the guard house. Three days later the letter was published in The London Times. Belgium awarded Branscomb and Carmichael the Médaille du Roi Albert and the Médaille de la Reine Élisabeth for their bravery. Both men later served as Chancellor of Vanderbilt University.

== Career ==
Branscomb began his career as an instructor in the department of philosophy at Southern Methodist University. He became a professor of New Testament literature at Duke University in 1925. He was awarded a Guggenheim Fellowship in 1930–1931 to study in Berlin and Marburg, Germany. He was the director of the Duke University Libraries from 1933 to 1941, He served as Dean of the Duke Divinity School from 1944 to 1946.

There, he sought to strengthen Duke University's leadership role in religious education and to strengthen connections between white and African American religious leaders, involving the latter in Duke Chapel services and programs for the first time.

Branscomb left the Deanship at Duke to become the fourth chancellor of Vanderbilt University from 1946 to 1963.

Upon Branscomb's arrival at Vanderbilt in 1946, higher education in the South was strictly segregated, and he was told that no Blacks had ever been on the Vanderbilt campus except in a "menial capacity." Branscomb viewed segregation as not only unjust but as a roadblock in Vanderbilt's – indeed the South's – path to national recognition and influence. As a Southerner, he was aware of the resistance to change of the all-white Vanderbilt Board of Trustees, the alumni, and the white Nashville community. Branscomb staked a strategy for integrating the university that was deliberate, methodical, and pragmatic.

Early in his tenure, Branscomb broke ground by inviting faculty of Fisk University, an HBCU in Nashville, to attend Vanderbilt campus activities, and he and his wife Margaret included Fisk faculty in social events attended by the more liberal Vanderbilt Trustees and faculty. In 1949, when Vanderbilt Law School received its first application from an African American, the Board directed Branscomb to reply that the application would not be considered and rejected Branscomb's suggested additional language "at this time."

In the early 1950s, Branscomb raised with the Trustees the fact that the courts had pressured some public universities to admit African Americans and had ordered the integration of the University of Tennessee student body. With no such legal orders directed at private universities the Board did not act broadly, but in 1952 it accepted Branscomb's proposal that students of color at nearby Scarritt College be allowed to enroll in Vanderbilt classes in light of a prior student exchange agreement. Not long thereafter, Branscomb joined the Board of the Southern Education Reporting Service (SERS), created to provide objective reporting on school desegregation that would counter the frequently biased, inflammatory Southern journalistic rhetoric on the topic.

In 1952 Branscomb worked behind the scenes with the Vanderbilt Divinity School Dean to draft a letter under the Dean's signature stating that the Divinity faculty were in favor of integration. Based on that letter, Branscomb requested two commitments from the Board of Trust. The first was that if a qualified African American should apply to the Divinity School, the application should be considered. The Board's agreement led to the admission of Vanderbilt's first African American student, an applicant to the Divinity School in 1953. That student, Rev. Joseph A. Johnson, later served on Vanderbilt's Board of Trust.

The second 1952 request was that Vanderbilt should admit African Americans to any programs where similar programs were not locally available to Blacks. The university lawyer objected that integrated classes were illegal under Tennessee law. To that, Branscomb recalled replying, "...that we would rely on him to defend us if we were hailed [sic: hauled] into court, but that as far as the public was concerned, I was confident it would not be convinced that what was legally required in Knoxville was against the law in Nashville," a reference to court ordered integration at the University of Tennessee. The Board agreed. This commitment resulted in the admission of Blacks to the Vanderbilt Law School in 1954, which led to public uproar and calls for Branscomb's resignation.

In 1960, James Lawson, a Congress of Racial Equality leader who was a Vanderbilt Divinity student, organized sit-ins in defiance of longstanding local segregation norms.

Meanwhile, the editor of the local newspaper, James Geddes Stahlman, was publishing inflammatory anti-integration articles in the Nashville paper, including the questionable assertion that Lawson was advising university students to break the law. Stahlman was an influential member of the Vanderbilt Board of Trust and on its executive committee, which voted to expel Lawson. Lawson was given the option of being expelled or withdrawing from the university. He refused to withdraw and under intense pressure from the Trustees, Chancellor Branscomb carried out the expulsion directive. A dozen faculty members resigned in protest.

Branscomb later re-examined his decision, regretting he did not consider the option of referring the matter to a committee to delay action for three months until Lawson's graduation. The university later apologized to Rev. Lawson, who returned to teach at Vanderbilt from 2006 to 2009.

In 1962, Branscomb quietly suggested to the student newspaper that student calls for full University integration could be persuasive. Buttressed by the resulting articles and a Faculty Senate resolution in favor that he had promoted, Branscomb's recommendation to integrate the remainder of the university programs was adopted at the Trustees' Meeting in May,1962, chaired by Board President H.S. Vanderbilt.

At the time of Branscomb's retirement in 1963, all of Vanderbilt's schools, colleges, eating facilities, and dormitories were integrated. In a speech at Vanderbilt Medical Center in 2006, Rev. Lawson expressed appreciation to the late Chancellor for taking the bold step of integrating Vanderbilt when almost all Southern universities were still segregated.

During Branscomb's tenure, at least 18 new buildings were erected on the Vanderbilt campus, the number of fulltime faculty doubled, faculty salaries almost tripled and the endowment went from $38 million to $88 million.

Branscomb served as first chairman of the United States Advisory Commission for Education Exchange from 1947 to 1951. From 1955 to 1958 he served as Commission on Education and International Affairs of the American Council of Education.

From 1963 to 1964 he was an educational consultant for the World Bank, and he chaired the United States Commission for UNESCO from 1963 to 1965. He also served as vice-chairman of the United States delegation to the Unesco General Conference in Paris in 1964, chair of the United States Delegation to the World Conference on the Eradication of Illiteracy in Tehran in 1965. He traveled to Geneva for the United States Delegation to the World Health Organization Assembly in 1965 and 1966, and to Buenos Aires to chair the U.S. Delegation to the Conference of Ministers of Education and Ministers in Charge of Planning in 1966.

Branscomb was the author of several books about New Testament theology. He was the president of the National Association of Biblical Instructors (later known as the American Academy of Religion) in 1940. He served on the commission on church and war of the Federal Council of Churches, and on the American theological committee of the World Council of Churches.

Branscomb served on the board of directors of the Association of Rhodes Scholars, and he was the editor of the American Oxonian in the 1940s. He was also on the board of the American Council of Learned Societies. Branscomb served on the editorial board of the South Atlantic Quarterly. He held honorary degrees from Brandeis University, Northwestern University, Southwestern University, and Hebrew Union College.

== Personal life and death ==
Branscomb married Margaret Vaughan, the daughter of a lawyer from Greenville, Texas, and the niece of a Vanderbilt alumna, in 1921 and they were married 71 years. They had three sons: Harvie, Ben and Lewis. They resided in Nashville, Tennessee. Branscomb played tennis and golf and raised gladioli and chrysanthemums.

Branscomb died at age 103 on July 23, 1998, in Nashville. His funeral was held in Benton Chapel on the Vanderbilt campus, where his remains are interred in a vault along with his wife's.

== Bibliography ==
- The Message of Jesus (1925)
- Jesus and the Law of Moses (1930)
- The Teachings of Jesus (1931)
- The Gospel of Mark (London: Hodder and Stoughton, 1937) Google snippet
- Teaching With Books (1940)
- Purely Academic: An Autobiography (1978)

Academic offices
Preceded by Oliver Carmichael	Chancellor of Vanderbilt University; 1946–1963	Succeeded by G. Alexander Heard
