= Lewis M. Branscomb =

American physicist (1926–2023)

Lewis McAdory Branscomb
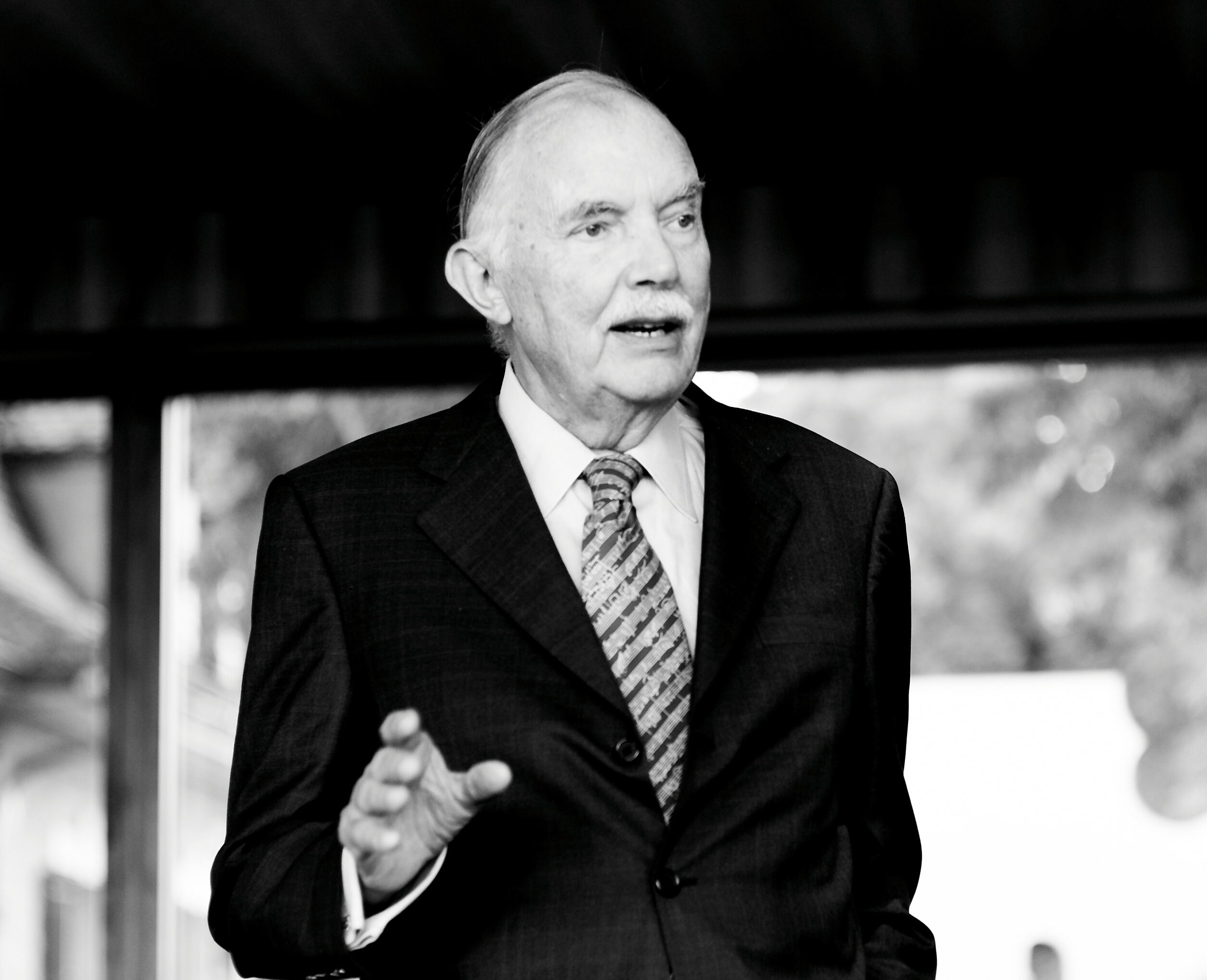
- Branscomb in 2007

6th Director of the National Bureau of Standards
- In office 1969–1972
- President: Richard Nixon
- Preceded by: Allen V. Astin
- Succeeded by: Richard W. Roberts

Personal details
- Born: August 17, 1926 Asheville, North Carolina, U.S.
- Died: May 31, 2023 (aged 96) Redwood City, California, U.S.
- Parent: Harvie Branscomb
- Relatives: Lewis C. Branscomb (paternal grandfather)
- Education: Duke University; Harvard University
- Website: www.branscomb.org/lewis.html
- Scientific career
- Fields: Physics
- Workplaces: National Bureau of Standards; IBM Corporation; Harvard University
- Thesis: Anomalous rotation of molecules with applications to the temperature of the upper atmosphere, and a note on maximizing the ratio of "signal to noise" in spectrophotometry of weak light sources (1950)
- Doctoral advisor: Donald Howard Menzel

Lewis McAdory Branscomb (August 17, 1926 – May 31, 2023) was an American physicist, government policy advisor, and corporate research manager. He was best known for being head of the National Bureau of Standards and, later, chief scientist of IBM; and as a prolific writer on science policy issues.

== Early life and education ==
Branscomb received a B.A. in physics from Duke University in 1945. He joined the navy reserves, where he deployed to the Philippines as a junior officer. He received his Ph.D. from Harvard in 1949, and remained two additional years as a junior fellow. These years, and his interactions with scholars as diverse as Clyde Kluckhohn, Merle Fainsod, William Fairbank, and Edward Purcell, kindled a lifelong interest in broad policy issues. No less remembered from this period, Branscomb played the role of "Professor" in Tom Lehrer's 1951 The Physical Revue, premiering several Lehrer songs in early versions.

== Early career ==
Branscomb joined the U.S. National Bureau of Standards (now NIST) in 1951 as a research physicist. Rising in management through several levels, he became the founding chair of the Joint Institute for Laboratory Astrophysics (JILA), and was in 1969 appointed director of the National Bureau of Standards by President Nixon. In 1972, Branscomb moved to IBM Corporation as vice president and chief scientist, and was later a member of the IBM Corporate Management Board. In 1986, he moved to Harvard as director of the Science, Technology and Public Policy Program in the John F. Kennedy School of Government at Harvard University, holding that position until 1996.

== Late career ==
Branscomb was a member of President Johnson's Science Advisory Committee (PSAC) from 1964 to 1968, during which time (a critical early period of the Apollo program) he chaired PSAC's Panel on Space Science and Technology. Under President Reagan, he was a member of the National Productivity Advisory Committee and was chair of the National Science Board (1980–1984). Other honors include president of the American Physical Society (1979), elected memberships in all three U.S. national academies (NAS, NAE, and IOM, as well as the American Philosophical Society), and honorary degrees from 15 universities. In 1998, Branscomb was awarded the Okawa Prize "for outstanding contributions to the progress of informatics, scientific and technological policy and corporate management." He served on the Advisory Board of the Journal of Science Policy & Governance. Branscomb was a Fellow of National Academy of Public Administration (United States).

== Death ==
Branscomb died on May 31, 2023, at the age of 96.

== Works ==
Branscomb was an author of more than 500 scholarly publications and 11 books. He served on the boards of several corporations (including General Foods and Mobil) and many non-profit organizations. For a continuous period of 57 years Branscomb and/or his father, B. Harvie Branscomb, served as a trustee of Vanderbilt University.

== Publications ==
- Beyond Spinoff: Military and Commercial Technologies in a Changing World, (with J. Alic, et al., 1992)
- Empowering Technology: Implementing a U.S. Policy (1993)
- Confessions of a Technophile (1994)
- Converging Infrastructures: Intelligent Transportation and the National Information Infrastructure (with James Keller, 1996)
- Informed Legislatures: Coping with Science in a Democracy (with Megan Jones and David Guston, 1996)
- Korea at the Turning Point: Innovation-Based Strategies for Development (with H.Y. Choi, 1996)
- Investing in Innovation: Creating a Research and Innovation Policy that Works (with James Keller, eds., 1998)
- Industrializing Knowledge: University-Industry Linkages in Japan and the United States (with Fumio Kodama and Richard Florida, eds., 1999)
- Taking Technical Risks: How Innovators, Executives, and Investors Manage High-Tech Risks (with Philip E. Auerswald, 2001),
- Making the Nation Safer: The Role of Science and Technology in Countering Terrorism (co-chaired with Richard Klausner, Committee on S&T for Countering Terrorism, National Academies, 2002)
- Seeds of Disaster, Roots of Response: How Private Action can Reduce Public Vulnerability (with P. Auerswald, Todd M. LaPorte, and E. Michel-Kerjan, Cambridge University Press, September 2006)

Government offices
Preceded by Allen V. Astin	6th Director of the National Bureau of Standards; 1969 – 1972	Succeeded by Richard W. Roberts
