= Robert A. Young (minister) =

American minister

- Born: Robert Anderson Young; January 23, 1824; Campbell's Station, Knox County, Tennessee, U.S.
- Died: February 1902 (aged 78); Nashville, Tennessee, U.S.
- Education: Washington College; Jackson College; Florence Wesleyan University
- Occupation: Clergyman
- Political party: Whig Party; Democratic Party
- Spouses: Mary A. Kemmer; Anna Green Hunter
- Relatives: Alexander Little Page Green (father-in-law)

Robert A. Young (1824–1902) was an American minister of the Methodist Episcopal Church, South. A descendant of slaveholding planters, he served as a minister in many churches in Tennessee, Alabama and Missouri in the Antebellum South. He served as the President of Florence Wesleyan University (later known as the University of North Alabama in Florence, Alabama from 1861 to 1864. He supported the Confederate States of America during the American Civil War, and he did not believe in the "social equality of the Negro" after the war. He was a founding trustee of Vanderbilt University in Nashville, Tennessee.

== Early life, family background and education ==
Robert A. Young was born on January 23, 1824, in Campbell's Station, Knox County, Tennessee. His father, Captain John C. Young, was a graduate of the University of North Carolina at Chapel Hill and "a large farmer and slaveholder" in Knox County, Tennessee, who died when Young was only six years old. He had two sisters and two brothers, including Robert R. Moore, another Methodist minister.

His paternal grandfather, Henry Young, immigrated from England to the United States as a ship-carpenter, settling in Baltimore, Maryland. His mother, Lucinda Hyder, was born in Carter County, Tennessee; her ancestors had immigrated to the United States from Germany. His maternal grandfather, John Hyder, was "a large farmer" in Carter County, while his maternal uncle, Michael Hyder, served in the Tennessee legislature, representing the same county.

Young was raised in a Presbyterian family, but he joined the Methodist Episcopal Church, South in 1842. He graduated from Washington College, a Presbyterian college, in 1844. One of his classmates was Zebulon Baird Vance, who later served as the governor of North Carolina. Young studied medicine briefly with a physician in Rheatown, Tennessee, but he decided to serve the Methodist Episcopal Church instead. As a minister, he received a master of arts degree from Jackson College in 1850. Additionally, he received a Doctor of Divinity from Florence Wesleyan University during the civil war. He was the recipient of a Legum Doctor from Washington College in 1895.

== Career ==
Young first became a minister of the Methodist Episcopal Church, South in Dandridge, Tennessee in 1845. He was recommended by Reverend Alexander Little Page Green to serve as minister for the Cumberland Iron Works from 1846 to 1848. He became a deacon in 1848 and an elder in 1850. He then served as minister in Columbia, Tennessee from 1848 to 1850, and in Huntsville, Alabama from 1850 to 1852. He turned down the offer to serve as President of the Florence Wesleyan University (a precursor to the University of North Alabama in 1852, and served as a minister in Lebanon, Tennessee for one year and in St. Louis, Missouri for two more years instead. He served as an elder of the St. Louis district of the Methodist Episcopal Church, South from 1855 to 1857, when he became presiding elder of its Lexington District until 1860. He briefly served as minister in Lebanon, Tennessee in the fall of 1860.

During the American Civil War, Young was a staunch supporter of the Confederate States of America. He served as the President of Florence Wesleyan University in Florence, Alabama from 1861 to 1864. He was a minister in Columbia, Tennessee in 1864 until he became minister of the Tulip Street Methodist Church in Edgefield, now East Nashville, in 1865. He served as the minister of McKendree Methodist Church from 1866 to 1870.

In the late 1860s, Young was the author of A Reply to Ariel, an essay about the ethnology of blacks. The essay was a response to a racist text entitled The Negro, authored by Buckner H. Payne under the pseudonym of "Ariel," which suggested blacks harked back to Eve's affair with a "subhuman beast" (sic). Even though Young "unashamedly admitted to anti-black prejudices" and failed to believe in the "social equality of the Negro," Young offered a scientific criticism suggesting there was only one human species regardless of skin color, citing Carl Linnaeus, George S. Blackie and Louis Agassiz.

Young served as the minister of Elm Street Methodist Church from 1870 to 1874. He was the editor of Advocates of Mission, a Methodist publication. Additionally, he served on the book committee of the Southern Methodist Publishing House.

Young served as the Financial Secretary of the Board of Trust of Vanderbilt University from its founding in 1874 to 1882. He continued to serve on its Board until 1902. He also served on the Board of Trust of the Nashville College for Young Ladies, and on the Nashville Board of Education for three years.

Young served on the board of directors of the American National Bank of Nashville.

== Personal life ==
Young married Mary A. Kemmer, a native of Bledsoe County, Tennessee, in June 1847. After she died in 1879, he married Anna Green Hunter, the daughter of Reverend Alexander Little Page Green, on August 18, 1880 in Nashville. By his second marriage, he had a stepson, Alexander Green Hunter, and two stepdaughters, Mary Green Hunter and Susie Hunter. They resided at 1405 Broad Street in Nashville, Tennessee.

Young joined the freemasonry in Edgefield, and he became a 14th-degree Knights Templar. Initially a supporter of the Whig Party like the rest of his family, he joined the Democratic Party because of the war.

Young traveled in Europe and the Holy Land.

== Death ==
Young died of strangulated hernia in February 1902 at his Nashville residence. His funeral was held at the West End Methodist Church in Nashville, Tennessee.

== Bibliography ==
- Personages: A Book of Living Characters. (Nashville, Tennessee: Printed for the author by John Berry McFerrin, 1861).
- Celebrities and less (European and American) (Nashville, Tennessee: Publishing House of the M. E. Church, South, 1888).
- Reminiscences. (Nashville, Dallas, Publishing House Methodist Episcopal Church, South, Barbee & Smith, agents, 1900).
