= List of Phi Alpha Honor Society chapters =

Phi Alpha Honor Society is a North America honor society for social work students. It was established in 1962 at Michigan State University. In the following list of Phi Alpha chapters, active chapters are indicated in bold and inactive chapters and institutions are in italics.

Chapters	Charter date and range	Institution	Location	Status	Ref.
**Alpha**	1962	Florida State University	Tallahassee, Florida	Active	(Note: Chapter formed from a local honor society called Phi Alpha.)
**Beta**	1962	Michigan State University	East Lansing, Michigan	Active	(Note: Chapter formed from the M.S.U. Social Work Club.)
Gamma	1962	Ohio Northern University	Ada, Ohio	Inactive	(Note: Chapter name is assumed based on charter order of the original chapters.)
Delta	1962	Central State University	Wilberforce, Ohio	Inactive	
Epsilon (First)	1962	University of Dayton	Dayton, Ohio	Inactive	
Zeta (First) (see **Epsilon Iota**)	1962	University of Tennessee	Knoxville, Tennessee	Consolidated	
Eta					
**Theta**	May 1963	University of North Dakota	Grand Forks, North Dakota	Active	(Note: Chapter formed from Sigma Upsilon Nu, a local social work honorary society.)
Iota					
Kappa					
Lambda					
**Mu**		University of Texas Rio Grande Valley	Edinburg, Texas	Active	(Note: Chapter formed at the University of Texas, Pan American, now the University of Texas Rio Grande Valley.)
**Nu**	May 31, 1964	East Tennessee State University	Johnson City, Tennessee	Active	
**Xi**		University of North Alabama	Florence, Alabama	Active	
**Omicron**		University of West Florida	Pensacola, Florida	Active	
Pi					
Rho					
**Sigma**		Juniata College	Huntingdon, Pennsylvania	Active	
**Tau**		Western Carolina University	Cullowhee, North Carolina	Active	
**Upsilon**		Capital University	Columbus, Ohio	Active	
Phi					
**Chi (First)**		Lincoln University	Jefferson City, Missouri	Active	
**Psi**		University of Alabama	Tuscaloosa, Alabama	Active	
**Omega**		Mercy University	Dobbs Ferry, New York	Active	
**Delta (Second)**	May 1982	University of Nevada, Las Vegas	Las Vegas, Nevada	Active	
**Epsilon (Second)**		California State University, Sacramento	Sacramento, California	Active	
**Zeta (Second)**		Tarleton State University	Stephenville, Texas	Active	
**Chi (Second)**	1990	George Mason University	Fairfax County, Virginia	Active	
Alpha Alpha					
**Alpha Beta**		Ohio University	Athens, Ohio	Active	
**Alpha Gamma**		University at Albany, SUNY	Albany, New York	Active	
**Alpha Delta**		Mississippi State University	Mississippi State, Mississippi	Active	
**Alpha Delta**		Mississippi Valley State University	Mississippi Valley State, Mississippi	Active	
Alpha Epsilon					
**Alpha Zeta**		California State University, Long Beach	Long Beach, California	Active	
**Alpha Eta**		University of Mary	Bismarck, North Dakota	Active	
**Alpha Theta**	19xx ?	Keuka College	Keuka Park, New York	Active	
Alpha Iota					
**Alpha Kappa**		Jackson State University	Jackson, Mississippi	Active	
**Alpha Lambda**		Shippensburg University	Shippensburg, Pennsylvania	Inactive	
Alpha Mu					
**Alpha Nu**		West Texas A&M University	Canyon, Texas	Active	
Alpha XI					
Alpha Omicron					
Alpha Pi					
Alpha Rho					
**Alpha Sigma**		Wartburg College	Waverly, Iowa	Active	
Alpha Tau					
Alpha Upsilon					
Alpha Phi					
**Alpha Chi**		Texas State University	San Marcos, Texas	Active	
**Alpha Psi**		Minot State University	Minot, North Dakota	Active	
**Alpha Psi**		State University of New York at Brockport	Brockport, New York	Active	
**Alpha Omega**		Bethel University	Arden Hills, Minnesota	Active	
**Beta Alpha**		Pacific Union College	Angwin, California	Active	
**Beta Beta**		Savannah State University	Savannah, Georgia	Active	
**Beta Gamma**		Madonna University	Livonia, Michigan	Active	
**Beta Delta**		Wichita State University	Wichita, Kansas	Active	
**Beta Epsilon**		Saint Paul College	Saint Paul, Minnesota	Inactive	
**Beta Epsilon**		St. Catherine University	Saint Paul, Minnesota	Active	
**Beta Epsilon**		University of St. Thomas	Saint Paul, Minnesota	Active	
**Beta Zeta**		Florida A&M University	Tallahassee, Florida	Active	
Beta Eta		Marygrove College	Detroit, Michigan	Inactive	(Note: Marygrove College closed in 2019.)
**Beta Theta**	19xx ?	University of Central Missouri	Warrensburg, Missouri	Active	
Beta Iota					
Beta Kappa					
Beta Lambda					
Beta Mu					
**Beta Nu**		California University of Pennsylvania	California, Pennsylvania	Inactive	
**Beta Xi**		Radford University	Radford, Virginia	Active	
Beta Omicron					
**Beta Pi**		Hood College	Frederick, Maryland	Active	
**Beta Rho**		Southern Connecticut State University	New Haven, Connecticut	Active	
**Beta Sigma**		Texas Woman's University	Denton, Texas	Active	
**Beta Tau**		University of Nebraska at Kearney	Kearney, Nebraska	Inactive	
Beta Upsilon					
Beta Phi					
**Beta Chi**		Bridgewater State University	Bridgewater, Massachusetts	Active	
**Beta Psi**		Illinois State University	Normal, Illinois	Active	
**Delta Alpha**		Lourdes University	Sylvania, Ohio	Active	
**Delta Beta**		Jacksonville State University	Jacksonville, Alabama	Active	
**Delta Gamma**		Niagara University	Niagara University, New York	Active	
**Delta Delta**		Our Lady of the Lake University	San Antonio, Texas	Active	
**Delta Epsilon**		Missouri Western State University	St. Joseph, Missouri	Active	
**Delta Zeta**		Cleveland State University	Cleveland, Ohio	Active	
**Delta Eta**		Northeastern State University	Tahlequah, Oklahoma	Active	
**Delta Theta**		Talladega College	Talladega, Alabama	Active	
**Delta Iota**		Florida International University	Westchester, Florida	Active	
Delta Kappa (First)		Maryville University	Town and Country, Missouri	Inactive	
**Delta Kappa (Second)**		Midwestern State University	Wichita Falls, Texas	Active	
**Delta Lambda**		Pittsburg State University	Pittsburg, Kansas	Active	
**Delta Mu**		Western Kentucky University	Bowling Green, Kentucky	Active	
**Delta Nu**		University of Iowa	Iowa City, Iowa	Inactive	
**Delta Xi**		Florida Atlantic University	Boca Raton, Florida	Active	
**Delta Omicron**		University of Maryland, Baltimore County	Catonsville, Maryland	Active	
Delta Pi (First)		University of Montana	Missoula, Montana	Inactive	
**Delta Pi (Second)**		Marian University	Fond du Lac, Wisconsin	Active	
**Delta Rho**		Pacific Lutheran University	Parkland, Washington	Active	
**Delta Sigma**		University of South Florida	Tampa, Florida	Active	
**Delta Tau**		University of Montevallo	Montevallo, Alabama	Active	
**Delta Upsilon**		Siena College	Loudonville, New York	Active	
**Delta Upsilon**		University of Mary Hardin–Baylor	Belton, Texas	Active	
Delta Phi					
Delta Chi					
**Delta Psi**		Spring Arbor University	Spring Arbor, Michigan	Active	
**Delta Omega**		Saginaw Valley State University	University Center, Michigan	Active	
**Epsilon Alpha**		Winthrop University	Rock Hill, South Carolina	Active	
**Epsilon Beta**		Appalachian State University	Boone, North Carolina	Active	
**Epsilon Gamma**		Marymount College, Tarrytown	Tarrytown, New York	Inactive	(Note: Marymount College, Tarrytown closed in 2007.)
**Epsilon Delta**		University of Wyoming	Laramie, Wyoming	Active	
**Epsilon Epsilon**		Lubbock Christian University	Lubbock, Texas	Active	
**Epsilon Zeta**		Frostburg State University	Frostburg, Maryland	Active	
**Epsilon Eta**		Saint Mary's College	Notre Dame, Indiana	Active	
**Epsilon Theta**		Columbia College	Columbia, Missouri	Active	
**Epsilon Iota**		University of Tennessee	Knoxville, Tennessee	Active	
**Epsilon Iota**		University of Tennessee at Memphis	Memphis, Tennessee	Inactive	
**Epsilon Iota**		University of Tennessee at Nashville	Nashville, Tennessee	Inactive	(Note: The University of Tennessee closed its Nashville campus in 1979.)
**Epsilon Kappa**		North Carolina State University	Raleigh, North Carolina	Active	
**Epsilon Lambda**		Metropolitan State University of Denver	Denver, Colorado	Active	
**Epsilon Mu**		Northern Arizona University	Flagstaff, Arizona	Active	
**Epsilon Nu**		Andrews University and Washington Adventist University	Berrien Springs, Michigan	Active	
**Epsilon Xi**		Bloomsburg University	Bloomsburg, Pennsylvania	Inactive	
**Epsilon Omicron**		Fort Hays State University	Hays, Kansas	Active	
**Epsilon Pi**		Elizabethtown College	Elizabethtown, Pennsylvania	Active	
Epsilon Rho (First)		McDaniel College	Westminster, Maryland	Inactive	(Note: Chapter formed at Western Maryland College, which became McDaniel College in 2002.)
**Epsilon Rho (Second**		University of Northern Iowa	Cedar Falls, Iowa	Active	
**Epsilon Sigma**		Louisiana Christian University	Pineville, Louisiana	Active	(Note: Chapter formed at Louisiana College, which became Louisiana Christian University in 2021.)
**Epsilon Tau**		Ashland University	Ashland, Ohio	Active	
**Epsilon Upsilon**		University of Memphis	Memphis, Tennessee	Active	
**Epsilon Phi**		Commonwealth University-Lock Haven	Lock Haven, Pennsylvania	Active	(Note: Chapter formed at Lock Haven University of Pennsylvania, which became Commonwealth University-Lock Haven in 2022.)
**Epsilon Chi**		University of Alaska Anchorage	Anchorage, Alaska	Active	
**Epsilon Psi**		Mercyhurst University	Erie, Pennsylvania	Active	
**Epsilon Psi**		Mississippi College	Clinton, Mississippi	Active	
**Epsilon Omega**		Cedarville University	Cedarville, Ohio	Active	
**Zeta Alpha**		Molloy University	Rockville Centre, New York	Active	
**Zeta Beta**		Mount Senario College	Ladysmith, Wisconsin	Inactive	
**Zeta Gamma**		Syracuse University	Syracuse, New York	Active	
**Zeta Delta**		Colorado State University Pueblo	Pueblo, Colorado	Active	
**Zeta Epsilon**		Aurora University	Aurora, Illinois	Active	
**Zeta Zeta**		Daemen University	Amherst, New York	Active	
**Zeta Eta**		University of North Texas	Denton, Texas	Active	
**Zeta Theta**		Hope College	Holland, Michigan	Active	
**Zeta Iota**		University of Southern Mississippi	Hattiesburg, Mississippi	Active	
**Zeta Kappa**		Clark Atlanta University	Atlanta, Georgia	Active	
**Zeta Lambda**		University of Michigan–Flint	Flint, Michigan	Active	
**Zeta Mu**		Carthage College	Kenosha, Wisconsin	Active	
**Zeta Nu**		Georgian Court University	Lakewood Township, New Jersey	Active	
**Zeta Xi**		Belmont University	Nashville, Tennessee	Active	
**Zeta Omicron**		Creighton University	Omaha, Nebraska	Active	
Zeta Pi					
**Zeta Rho**		Western New Mexico University	Silver City, New Mexico	Active	
**Zeta Sigma**		Columbia College	Columbia, South Carolina	Active	
**Zeta Tau**		Mount St. Joseph University	Delhi Township, Ohio	Active	
**Zeta Upsilon**		Alvernia University	Reading, Pennsylvania	Active	
**Zeta Phi**		Youngstown State University	Youngstown, Ohio	Active	
**Zeta Chi**		Kean University	Union Township, New Jersey	Active	
**Zeta Psi**		Austin Peay State University	Clarksville, Tennessee	Active	
Zeta Omega		MacMurray College	Jacksonville, Illinois	Inactive	(Note: MacMurray College closed in 2020.)
**Eta Alpha**		Minnesota State University, Mankato	Mankato, Minnesota	Active	
**Eta Beta**		University of Alabama at Birmingham	Birmingham, Alabama	Active	
Eta Gamma		Presentation College, South Dakota	Aberdeen, South Dakota	Inactive	
**Eta Delta**		Albany State University	Albany, Georgia	Active	
**Eta Epsilon**		New Mexico Highlands University	Las Vegas, New Mexico	Inactive	
**Eta Zeta**		University of Maine	Orono, Maine	Active	
**Eta Eta**		Howard University	Washington, D.C.	Active	
**Eta Theta**		University of Findlay	Findlay, Ohio	Active	
**Eta Iota**		Azusa Pacific University	Azusa, California	Active	
**Eta Kappa**		Campbell University	Buies Creek, North Carolina	Active	
**Eta Lambda**		Bowie State University	Bowie, Maryland	Active	
**Eta Mu**		University of Southern Maine	Portland, Maine	Active	
**Eta Nu**		Lincoln Memorial University	Harrogate, Tennessee	Active	
**Eta Xi**		Delta State University	Cleveland, Mississippi	Active	
**Eta Omicron**		Plymouth State University	Plymouth, New Hampshire	Active	
**Eta Pi**		Oakwood University	Huntsville, Alabama	Active	
**Eta Rho**		Methodist University	Fayetteville, North Carolina	Active	
**Eta Sigma**		Baylor University	Waco, Texas	Active	
**Eta Tau**		University of Texas at Austin	Austin, Texas	Active	
**Eta Upsilon**		University of Wisconsin–Eau Claire	Eau Claire, Wisconsin	Active	
**Eta Phi**		Union University	Jackson, Tennessee	Active	
**Eta Chi**		Commonwealth University-Mansfield	Mansfield, Pennsylvania	Active	(Note: Chapter formed at Mansfield University of Pennsylvania, which became Commonwealth University-Mansfield in 2022.)
**Eta Psi**		Anna Maria College	Paxton, Massachusetts	Active	
**Eta Omega**		University of North Carolina Wilmington	Wilmington, North Carolina	Active	
**Theta Alpha**		Millersville University	Millersville, Pennsylvania	Active	
**Theta Beta**		Virginia State University	Ettrick, Virginia	Active	
**Theta Gamma**		Utah State University	Logan, Utah	Active	
**Theta Delta**		Ramapo College	Mahwah, New Jersey	Active	
**Theta Epsilon**		University of Nebraska Omaha	Omaha, Nebraska	Active	
**Theta Zeta**		University of Arkansas at Monticello	Monticello, Arkansas	Active	
**Theta Eta**		Ferris State University	Big Rapids, Michigan	Active	
**Theta Theta**		Whittier College	Whittier, California	Active	
Theta Iota (First) (see **Phi Omicron**)		North Carolina A&T State University	Greensboro, North Carolina	Reestablished	
**Theta Iota (Second)**		University of North Carolina at Greensboro-Graduate	Greensboro, North Carolina	Active	
**Theta Kappa**		Middle Tennessee State University	Murfreesboro, Tennessee	Active	
**Theta Lambda**		Rochester Institute of Technology	Rochester, New York	Inactive	
**Theta Mu**		Eastern Nazarene College	Quincy, Massachusetts	Active	
**Theta Nu**		Evangel University	Springfield, Missouri	Active	
**Theta Xi**		Anderson University	Anderson, Indiana	Active	
**Theta Omicron**		Hawaii Pacific University	Honolulu, Hawaii	Active	
**Theta Pi**		Colorado State University	Fort Collins, Colorado	Active	
**Theta Rho**		Coppin State University	Baltimore, Maryland	Active	
**Theta Sigma**		St. Ambrose University	Davenport, Iowa	Active	
**Theta Tau**		Arizona State University	Tempe, Arizona	Active	
**Theta Tau**		Arizona State University West Valley campus	Phoenix, Arizona	Inactive	
**Theta Upsilon**		Stockton University	Galloway Township, New Jersey	Active	
**Theta Phi**		Western Michigan University	Kalamazoo, Michigan	Active	
**Theta Chi**		Texas Lutheran University	Seguin, Texas	Inactive	
**Theta Psi**		Boise State University	Boise, Idaho	Active	
**Theta Omega**		Stephen F. Austin State University	Nacogdoches, Texas	Active	
**Iota Alpha**		Olivet Nazarene University	Bourbonnais, Illinois	Active	
**Iota Beta**		Eastern Washington University	Cheney, Washington	Active	
**Iota Gamma**		Saint Leo University	St. Leo, Florida	Active	
**Iota Delta**		William Woods University	Fulton, Missouri	Active	
**Iota Epsilon**		California State Polytechnic University, Humboldt	Arcata, California	Active	(Note: Chapter formed at Humboldt State University, which became the California State Polytechnic University, Humboldt in 2022.)
**Iota Zeta**		Nebraska Wesleyan University	Lincoln, Nebraska	Active	
**Iota Eta**		Bradley University	Peoria, Illinois	Active	
**Iota Theta**		La Sierra University	Riverside, California	Active	
**Iota Iota**		University of North Carolina at Pembroke	Pembroke, North Carolina	Active	
**Iota Kappa**		Cedar Crest College	Allentown, Pennsylvania	Active	
**Iota Lambda**		Valparaiso University	Valparaiso, Indiana	Active	
**Iota Mu**		Southern Arkansas University	Magnolia, Arkansas	Active	
**Iota Nu**		University of North Carolina at Greensboro	Greensboro, North Carolina	Active	
**Iota Xi**		Texas Christian University	Fort Worth, Texas	Active	
**Iota Omicron**		Weber State University	Ogden, Utah	Active	
**Iota Pi**		Loma Linda University	Loma Linda, California	Active	
**Iota Rho**		Castleton University	Castleton, Vermont	Active	
**Iota Rho**		Vermont State University	Castleton, Vermont	Active	
**Iota Sigma**		Arkansas State University	Jonesboro, Arkansas	Active	
Iota Tau		Carroll University	Waukesha, Wisconsin	Inactive	
**Iota Upsilon**		Miles College	Fairfield, Alabama	Active	
Iota Phi		Westfield State University	Westfield, Massachusetts	Inactive	
**Iota Chi**		LIU Brooklyn	Brooklyn, New York	Active	
**Iota Psi**		Mississippi State University, Meridian Campus	Meridian, Mississippi	Active	
**Iota Omega**		University of Texas at Arlington	Arlington, Texas	Active	
**Kappa Alpha**		University of Georgia	Athens, Georgia	Active	
**Kappa Alpha**		Valdosta State University	Valdosta, Georgia	Inactive	
Kappa Beta		Dana College	Blair, Nebraska	Inactive	(Note: Dana College closed in 2010.)
**Kappa Gamma**		Indiana University Bloomington	Bloomington, Indiana	Active	
**Kappa Delta**		Lipscomb University	Nashville, Tennessee	Active	
Kappa Epsilon (see Chi Pi First)		Edinboro University of Pennsylvania	Edinboro, Pennsylvania	Re-established	
**Kappa Zeta**		Morgan State University	Baltimore, Maryland	Active	
Kappa Eta					
Kappa Theta					
Kappa Iota					
Kappa Kappa					
Kappa Lambda					
Kappa Mu					
Kappa Nu					
**Kappa Xi**		University of Alaska Fairbanks	College, Alaska	Active	
**Kappa Omicron**		Concord University	Athens, West Virginia	Active	
**Kappa Pi**		Southeastern Louisiana University	Hammond, Louisiana	Active	
**Kappa Rho**		University of St. Francis	Joliet, Illinois	Active	
**Kappa Sigma**		Western Illinois University	Macomb, Illinois	Active	
**Kappa Tau**		Iona University	New Rochelle, New York	Active	
**Kappa Phi**		University of Missouri–St. Louis	St. Louis, Missouri	Active	
**Kappa Chi**		Brigham Young University–Hawaii	Lāʻie, Hawaii	Active	
**Kappa Psi**		Benedict College	Columbia, South Carolina	Active	
**Kappa Psi**		University of South Carolina	Columbia, South Carolina	Active	
**Kappa Omega**		Buffalo State University	Buffalo, New York	Active	
**Kappa Omega**		New Mexico State University	Las Cruces, New Mexico	Active	
**Lambda Alpha**		Texas A&M University–Kingsville	Kingsville, Texas	Active	
**Lambda Beta**		University of Nevada, Reno	Reno, Nevada	Active	
Lambda Gamma		University of Illinois Springfield	Springfield, Illinois	Inactive	
**Lambda Delta**		South Carolina State University	Orangeburg, South Carolina	Active	
**Lambda Epsilon**		Chadron State College	Chadron, Nebraska	Active	
**Lambda Zeta**		La Salle University	Philadelphia, Pennsylvania	Active	
**Lambda Eta**		LIU Post	Brookville, New York	Active	
**Lambda Theta**		Luther College	Decorah, Iowa	Active	
**Lambda Iota**		University of Utah	Salt Lake City, Utah	Active	
**Lambda Kappa**		Chatham University	Pittsburgh, Pennsylvania	Active	
Lambda Lambda					
Lambda Mu					
**Lambda Nu**		Prairie View A&M University	Prairie View, Texas	Active	
**Lambda Nu**		Texas A&M University	College Station, Texas	Active	
**Lambda Xi**		Livingstone College	Salisbury, North Carolina	Active	
Lambda Omicron (see **Lambda Nu Mu**)		Southern University	Baton Rouge, Louisiana	Inactive	
**Lambda Pi**		Adelphi University	Garden City, New York	Active	
**Lambda Rho**		University of Toledo	Toledo, Ohio	Active	
**Lambda Sigma**		Buena Vista University	Storm Lake, Iowa	Active	
**Lambda Tau**		Seattle University	Seattle, Washington	Active	
**Lambda Upsilon**		Newman University	Wichita, Kansas	Active	
**Lambda Phi**		Grambling State University	Grambling, Louisiana	Active	
Lambda Chi		University of Sioux Falls	Sioux Falls, South Dakota	Inactive	
**Lambda Psi**		Messiah University	Grantham, Pennsylvania	Active	
**Lambda Omega**		Meredith College	Raleigh, North Carolina	Active	
**Mu Alpha**		Southwestern Oklahoma State University	Weatherford, Oklahoma	Active	
**Mu Beta**		San Francisco State University	San Francisco, California	Active	
**Mu Gamma**		Kutztown University	Kutztown, Pennsylvania	Active	
**Mu Delta**		University of Southern Indiana	Evansville, Indiana	Active	
**Mu Epsilon**		Monmouth University	West Long Branch, New Jersey	Active	
**Mu Eta**		University of Vermont	Burlington, Vermont	Active	
**Mu Theta**		University of Portland	Portland, Oregon	Active	
**Mu Iota**		West Virginia University	Morgantown, West Virginia	Active	
Mu Kappa					
**Mu Lambda**		University of Houston	Houston, Texas	Active	
Mu Mu					
Mu Nu					
**Mu Xi**		Washburn University	Topeka, Kansas	Active	
**Mu Omicron**		University of Pittsburgh	Pittsburgh, Pennsylvania	Active	
**Mu Pi**		Gallaudet University	Washington, D.C.	Active	
**Mu Rho**		Alabama State University	Montgomery, Alabama	Active	
Mu Sigma		Murray State University	Murray, Kentucky	Inactive	
**Mu Tau**		Indiana State University	Terre Haute, Indiana	Active	
Mu Upsilon		Texas Tech University	Lubbock, Texas	Inactive	
**Mu Upsilon**		California State University, San Bernardino	San Bernardino, California	Active	
Mu Phi		Mountain State University	Beckley, West Virginia	Closed	(Note: Mountain State University closed in 2013.)
**Mu Chi**		Southern Adventist University	Collegedale, Tennessee	Active	
Mu Psi		University of Kansas	Lawrence, Kansas	Active	
**Mu Omega**		Roberts Wesleyan University	Chili, New York	Active	
**Nu Alpha**		Widener University	Chester, Pennsylvania	Active	
Nu Beta					
**Nu Gamma**		North Carolina Central University	Durham, North Carolina	Active	
**Nu Delta**		University of Arkansas at Little Rock	Little Rock, Arkansas	Active	
**Nu Epsilon**		Bethany College	Bethany, West Virginia	Active	
**Nu Zeta**		Dalton State College	Dalton, Georgia	Inactive	
**Nu Eta**		Kentucky State University	Frankfort, Kentucky	Active	
**Nu Theta**	2005	University of North Carolina at Charlotte	Charlotte, North Carolina	Active	
**Nu Iota**		University of Houston–Clear Lake	Houston, Texas	Active	
**Nu Kappa**		University of the District of Columbia	Washington, D.C.	Active	
**Nu Lambda**		University of Missouri–Kansas City	Kansas City, Missouri	Active	
Nu Mu					
Nu Nu					
Nu XI					
**Nu Omicron**		Rutgers University–New Brunswick	New Brunswick, New Jersey	Active	
**Nu Pi**		University of Central Florida	Orlando, Florida	Active	
**Nu Rho**		Virginia Commonwealth University	Richmond, Virginia	Active	
**Nu Sigma**		University of Hawaiʻi at Mānoa	Honolulu, Hawaii	Active	
**Nu Tau**		Springfield College	Springfield, Massachusetts	Active	
**Nu Upsilon**		University of Oklahoma	Norman, Oklahoma	Active	
**Nu Upsilon**		University of Oklahoma Tulsa	Tulsa, Oklahoma	Active	
**Nu Phi**		Fayetteville State University	Fayetteville, North Carolina	Active	
**Nu Chi**		Lewis–Clark State College	Lewiston, Idaho	Active	
Nu Psi					
Nu Omega		Dominican University Prior Campus	River Forest, Illinois	Inactive	(Note: Dominican University closed its Priory Campus in June 2012.)
**Xi Alpha**		Bennett College	Greensboro, North Carolina	Active	
**Xi Beta**		LIU Post Graduate	Brookville, New York	Active	
Xi Delta					
**Xi Gamma**		Fordham University	Bronx, New York City, New York	Active	
**Xi Epsilon**		University of Arkansas	Fayetteville, Arkansas	Active	
**Xi Zeta**		Cairn University	Langhorne Manor, Pennsylvania	Inactive	(Note: Chapter formed at Biblical University, now Cairn University.)
**Xi Eta**		California State University, Bakersfield	Bakersfield, California	Active	
Xi Theta		Northwestern Oklahoma State University	Alva, Oklahoma	Inactive	
**Xi Iota**		Southern Illinois University Edwardsville	Edwardsville, Illinois	Active	
**Xi Kappa**		Gannon University	Erie, Pennsylvania	Inactive	
**Xi Lambda**		Avila University	Kansas City, Missouri	Active	
**Xi Mu**		Texas Southern University	Houston, Texas	Active	
**Xi Nu**		Franciscan University of Steubenville	Steubenville, Ohio	Active	
**Xi Xi**		Sacred Heart University	Fairfield, Connecticut	Active	
**Xi Omicron**		State University of New York at Plattsburgh	Plattsburgh, New York	Active	
**Xi Pi**		University of Washington Tacoma	Tacoma, Washington	Active	
**Xi Rho**		Southern Illinois University Carbondale	Carbondale, Illinois	Active	
**Xi Sigma**		University of Kentucky	Lexington, Kentucky	Active	
**Xi Tau**		University of South Carolina	Columbia, South Carolina	Active	
**Xi Upsilon**		University of Texas at San Antonio	San Antonio, Texas	Active	
**Xi Phi**		Southern University at New Orleans	New Orleans, Louisiana	Active	
**Xi Chi**		Portland State University	Portland, Oregon	Active	
**Xi Psi**		Southeastern University	Lakeland, Florida	Active	
**Xi Omega**		Campbellsville University	Campbellsville, Kentucky	Active	
**Omicron Alpha**		Barton College	Wilson, North Carolina	Active	
**Omicron Beta**		Governors State University	University Park, Illinois	Active	
**Omicron Gamma**	November 2007	Georgia State University	Atlanta, Georgia	Active	
**Omicron Delta**		Augsburg University	Minneapolis, Minnesota	Active	
**Omicron Epsilon**		University of Southern California	Los Angeles, California	Active	
**Omicron Zeta**		Kennesaw State University	Kennesaw, Georgia	Active	
**Omicron Eta**		Ursuline College	Pepper Pike, Ohio	Active	
**Omicron Theta**		University of Texas at El Paso	El Paso, Texas	Active	
**Omicron Iota**		Florida Gulf Coast University	Fort Myers, Florida	Active	
**Omicron Kappa**		Pacific University	Forest Grove, Oregon	Active	
**Omicron Lambda**		Concordia College	Moorhead, Minnesota	Active	
**Omicron Mu**		Defiance College	Defiance, Ohio	Active	
**Omicron Nu**		College of Saint Rose	Albany, New York	Active	
**Omicron Xi**		University of Tennessee at Chattanooga	Chattanooga, Tennessee	Inactive	
**Omicron Omicron**		Wayne State University	Detroit, Michigan	Active	
**Omicron Pi**		Johnson C. Smith University	Charlotte, North Carolina	Active	
**Omicron Rho**		Eastern New Mexico University	Portales, New Mexico	Active	
**Omicron Tau**		Thomas University	Thomasville, Georgia	Active	
**Omicron Upsilon**		Slippery Rock University	Slippery Rock, Pennsylvania	Active	
**Omicron Phi**		Oakland University	Rochester, Michigan	Active	
**Omicron Chi**		California State University, Dominguez Hills	Carson, California	Active	
**Omicron Psi**		Freed–Hardeman University	Henderson, Tennessee	Inactive	
**Omicron Omega**		University of Akron	Akron, Ohio	Active	
**Pi Alpha**		University of Mississippi	University, Mississippi	Active	
**Pi Beta**		Shepherd University	Shepherdstown, West Virginia	Active	
Pi Gamma		Abilene Christian University	Abilene, Texas	Inactive	
**Pi Delta**		Northwestern State University	Natchitoches, Louisiana	Active	
**Pi Epsilon**		Northern Kentucky University	Highland Heights, Kentucky	Active	
**Pi Zeta**		Eastern Connecticut State University	Willimantic, Connecticut	Active	
**Pi Zeta**		Winston-Salem State University	Winston-Salem, North Carolina	Active	
**Pi Eta**		Malone University	Canton, Ohio	Active	
**Pi Theta**		Florida Memorial University	Miami Gardens, Florida	Active	
**Pi Kappa**		Northeastern Illinois University	Chicago, Illinois	Active	
**Pi Lambda**		Binghamton University	Binghamton, New York	Active	
**Pi Mu**		Adrian College	Adrian, Michigan	Active	
**Pi Nu**		University of South Alabama	Mobile, Alabama	Active	
**Pi Xi**		Walla Walla University	College Place, Washington	Active	
**Pi Omicron**		Warren Wilson College	Swannanoa, North Carolina	Active	
**Pi Pi**		New York University	New York City, New York	Active	
Pi Rho		University of Cincinnati	Cincinnati, Ohio	Inactive	
**Pi Rho**		Texas A&M University–Central Texas	Killeen, Texas	Active	
**Pi Tau**		Touro College Bay Shore	Bay Shore, New York	Active	
**Pi Upsilon**		Shaw University	Raleigh, North Carolina	Active	
**Pi Phi**		University of Louisville	Louisville, Kentucky	Active	
**Pi Chi**		University of New Hampshire	Durham, New Hampshire	Active	
**Pi Psi**		Elizabeth City State University	Elizabeth City, North Carolina	Active	
**Pi Omega**		Viterbo University	La Crosse, Wisconsin	Active	
**Rho Alpha**		Lambuth University	Jackson, Tennessee	Inactive	
**Rho Beta**		University of Windsor	Windsor, Ontario, Canada	Active	
**Rho Gamma**		Northwest Nazarene University	Nampa, Idaho	Active	
**Rho Delta**		Ohio Dominican University	Columbus, Ohio	Active	
**Rho Epsilon**		Park University, Kansas City	Kansas City, Missouri	Active	
Rho Zeta		Union Commonwealth University	Barbourville, Kentucky	Active	(Note: Chapter formed at Union College, now Union Commonwealth University.)
**Rho Zeta**		University of Indianapolis	Indianapolis, Indiana	Active	
Rho Eta					
Rho Theta					
Rho Iota		Limestone University	Gaffney, South Carolina	Inactive	(Note: Limestone University closed in 2025.)
**Rho Iota**		Coker University	Hartsville, South Carolina	Active	
**Rho Kappa**		University at Buffalo	Buffalo, New York	Active	
**Rho Lambda**		Xavier University	Cincinnati, Ohio	Active	
**Rho Mu**		Lewis University	Romeoville, Illinois	Active	
**Rho Nu**		Mount Mary University	Milwaukee, Wisconsin	Active	
**Rho Xi**		Spalding University	Louisville, Kentucky	Active	
**Rho Omicron**		Champlain College	Burlington, Vermont	Active	
**Rho Pi**		Augusta University	Augusta, Georgia	Active	(Note: Chapter formed at Georgia Regents University, which became Augusta University in 2015.)
**Rho Rho**		Dominican University New York	Orangeburg, New York	Active	
Rho Sigma					
Rho Tau					
Rho Upsilon					
Rho Phi					
Rho Chi					
Rho Psi					
Rho Omega					
**Sigma Alpha**		University of Wisconsin–Stevens Point	Stevens Point, Wisconsin	Active	
**Sigma Beta**		Hardin–Simmons University	Abilene, Texas	Active	
Sigma Gamma		Sacramento State University	Sacramento, California	Inactive	
**Sigma Delta**		University of Wisconsin–Madison	Madison, Wisconsin	Active	
**Sigma Epsilon**		Texas State University	San Marcos, Texas	Active	(Note: Chapter formed at Southwest Texas State University, now Texas State University.)
**Sigma Zeta**		Marywood University	Scranton, Pennsylvania	Active	
**Sigma Eta**		University of Saint Francis	Fort Wayne, Indiana	Active	
**Sigma Theta**		University of South Dakota	Vermillion, South Dakota	Active	
**Sigma Iota**		California State University, Northridge	Northridge, Los Angeles, California	Active	
**Sigma Kappa**		DePaul University	Chicago, Illinois	Active	
**Sigma Lambda**		University of New England, Portland	Portland, Maine	Active	
**Sigma Mu**		Marshall University	Huntington, West Virginia	Active	
**Sigma Nu**		Pontifical Catholic University of Puerto Rico	Ponce, Puerto Rico	Active	
**Sigma Xi**		Belhaven University	Jackson, Mississippi	Active	
**Sigma Omicron**		Simmons University	Boston, Massachusetts	Active	
**Sigma Pi**		University of Tennessee at Martin	Martin, Tennessee	Active	
**Sigma Rho**		Centenary University	Hackettstown, New Jersey	Active	
**Sigma Sigma**		Fontbonne University	Clayton, Missouri	Active	
**Sigma Tau**		University of Wisconsin–Whitewater	Whitewater, Wisconsin	Active	
**Sigma Upsilon**		Angelo State University	San Angelo, Texas	Active	
**Sigma Phi**		Mary Baldwin University	Staunton, Virginia	Active	
**Sigma Chi**		Huntington University	Huntington, Indiana	Active	
**Sigma Psi**		Central Michigan University	Mount Pleasant, Michigan	Active	
**Sigma Omega**		Warner University	Lake Wales, Florida	Active	
**Tau Alpha**		Virginia Wesleyan University	Virginia Beach, Virginia	Active	
**Tau Beta**		West Liberty University	West Liberty, West Virginia	Active	
**Tau Gamma**		Auburn University	Auburn, Alabama	Active	
**Tau Delta**		University of Houston–Downtown	Houston, Texas	Active	
**Tau Epsilon**		Yeshiva University	New York City, New York	Active	
**Tau Zeta**		Trevecca Nazarene University	Nashville, Tennessee	Active	
**Tau Eta**		California State University, Los Angeles	Los Angeles, California	Active	
**Tau Theta**		Tuskegee University	Tuskegee, Alabama	Active	
**Tau Iota**		Kansas State University	Manhattan, Kansas	Active	
**Tau Kappa**		Siena Heights University	Adrian, Michigan	Active	
**Tau Lambda**		University of North Florida	Jacksonville, Florida	Active	
**Tau Mu**		Saint Louis University	St. Louis, Missouri	Active	
**Tau Nu**		Winona State University	Winona, Minnesota	Active	
**Tau Xi**		Eastern Kentucky University	Richmond, Kentucky	Active	
**Tau Omicron**		Virginia Union University	Richmond, Virginia	Active	
**Tau Pi**		Catholic University of America	Washington, D.C.	Active	
**Tau Rho**		Ferrum College	Ferrum, Virginia	Active	
**Tau Sigma**		Walden University	Minneapolis, Minnesota	Active	
**Tau Tau**		Lancaster Bible College	Lancaster, Pennsylvania	Active	
**Tau Upsilon**		Southwest Baptist University	Bolivar, Missouri	Active	
**Tau Phi**		Salem State University	Salem, Massachusetts	Active	
**Tau Chi**		Alcorn State University	Lorman, Mississippi	Active	
**Tau Psi**		Miami University	Oxford, Ohio	Active	
**Tau Omega**		College of Staten Island	Staten Island, New York	Active	
**Upsilon Pi**		Tulane University	New Orleans, Louisiana	Active	
**Upsilon Sigma**		San Diego State University	San Diego, California	Active	
**Upsilon Tau**		Saint Francis University	Loretto, Pennsylvania	Active	
**Upsilon Upsilon**		Eastern Michigan University	Ypsilanti, Michigan	Active	
**Upsilon Phi**		Seton Hill University	Greensburg, Pennsylvania	Active	
**Upsilon Chi**		Ball State University	Muncie, Indiana	Active	
**Upsilon Omega**		University of California, Los Angeles	Los Angeles, California	Active	
**Phi Alpha**		St. Edward's University	Austin, Texas	Active	
**Phi Beta**		University of Valley Forge	Phoenixville, Pennsylvania	Active	
**Phi Gamma**		Washington University in St. Louis	St. Louis, Missouri	Active	
**Phi Delta**		University of Wisconsin–Green Bay	Green Bay, Wisconsin	Active	
**Phi Epsilon**		University of Texas Permian Basin	Odessa, Texas	Active	
**Phi Zeta**		Morehead State University Prestonsburg	Prestonsburg, Kentucky	Active	
**Phi Eta**		Wright State University, Dayton	Dayton, Ohio	Active	
**Phi Theta**		Stony Brook University	Stony Brook, New York	Active	
**Phi Iota**		Bowling Green State University	Bowling Green, Ohio	Active	
Phi Kappa					
Phi Lambda					
**Phi Mu**		State University of New York at Fredonia	Fredonia, New York	Active	
**Phi Nu**		Lindenwood University	St. Charles, Missouri	Active	
**Phi Xi**		Trinity Christian College	Palos Heights, Illinois	Active	
**Phi Omicron** (see Theta Iota)		North Carolina A&T State University	Greensboro, North Carolina	Active	
**Phi Pi**		Concordia University Wisconsin	Mequon, Wisconsin	Active	
Phi Rho					
**Phi Sigma**		Saint Martin's University	Lacey, Washington	Active	
**Phi Tau**		Capella University	Minneapolis, Minnesota	Active	
**Phi Upsilon**		East Central University	Ada, Oklahoma	Active	
Phi Phi					
**Phi Chi**		Asbury University	Wilmore, Kentucky	Active	
**Phi Psi**		Longwood University	Farmville, Virginia	Active	
**Phi Omega**		University of Pikeville	Pikeville, Kentucky	Active	
**Chi Alpha**		James Madison University	Harrisonburg, Virginia	Active	
**Chi Alpha**		Troy University	Troy, Alabama	Active	
**Chi Beta**		University of Louisiana at Monroe	Monroe, Louisiana	Active	(Note: Chapter formed at Northeast Louisiana University, which became the University of Louisiana at Monroe in 1999.)
**Chi Gamma**	1991	West Chester University	West Chester, Pennsylvania	Active	
**Chi Gamma**		Missouri Southern State University	Joplin, Missouri	Active	
**Chi Delta**		University of Missouri	Columbia, Missouri	Active	
**Chi Delta**	March 14, 2017	University of Toronto	Toronto, Ontario, Canada	Active	
**Chi Epsilon**	April 2017	Briar Cliff University	Sioux City, Iowa	Active	
**Chi Epsilon**		Grand Valley State University	Allendale, Michigan	Active	
**Chi Zeta**		East Carolina University	Greenville, North Carolina	Active	
**Chi Zeta**		Tennessee State University	Nashville, Tennessee	Active	
**Chi Eta**		Salisbury University	Salisbury, Maryland	Active	
**Chi Eta**	2017	Providence College	Providence, Rhode Island	Active	
**Chi Theta**		Liberty University	Lynchburg, Virginia	Active	
**Chi Iota**	1993	Alabama A&M University	Normal, Alabama	Active	
**Chi Kappa**		Christopher Newport University	Newport News, Virginia	Active	
Chi Lambda		University of Detroit Mercy	Detroit, Michigan	Inactive	
**Chi Lambda**		Southeast Missouri State University	Cape Girardeau, Missouri	Active	
Chi Mu					
**Chi Nu**		California State University, Fresno	Fresno, California	Active	
**Chi Xi**		Neumann University	Aston Township, Pennsylvania	Active	
**Chi Omicron**		Grand View University	Des Moines, Iowa	Active	
Chi Pi (First) (see Kappa Epsilon)		Pennsylvania Western University, Edinboro	Edinboro, Pennsylvania	Inactive	
**Chi Pi (Second)**		East Stroudsburg University	East Stroudsburg, Pennsylvania	Active	
**Chi Pi (Third)**		Mount Mercy University	Cedar Rapids, Iowa	Active	
**Chi Rho**		Saint Joseph's College of Maine	Windham, Maine	Active	
**Chi Sigma**		Western Connecticut State University	Danbury, Connecticut	Active	
**Chi Sigma**	February 2018	York College, City University of New York	Jamaica, Queens, New York	Active	
**Chi Tau**		Tennessee Wesleyan University	Athens, Tennessee	Active	
**Chi Upsilon**		Central Connecticut State University	New Britain, Connecticut	Active	
Chi Phi					
Chi Chi					
Chi Psi (First)		California State University, East Bay	Hayward, California	Inactive	
**Chi Psi (Second)**	2016	Brescia University	Owensboro, Kentucky	Active	
**Chi Omega**		King University	Bristol, Tennessee	Active	
**Chi Omega**		Minnesota State University Moorhead	Moorhead, Minnesota	Active	
**Psi Omega**		LIU Brentwood	Brentwood, New York	Active	
**Alpha Beta Gamma**		Chamberlain University	Chicago, Illinois	Active	
**Alpha Beta Gamma**		Loyola University Chicago	Chicago, Illinois	Active	
Beta Gamma Delta		Brandman University	Aliso Viejo, California	Inactive	(Note: Brandman University became the University of Massachusetts Global in 2021.)
**Gamma Delta Epsilon**		Louisiana State University	Baton Rouge, Louisiana	Active	
**Gamma Delta Epsilon**		Salve Regina University	Newport, Rhode Island	Active	
**Delta Iota Xi**		Auburn University at Montgomery	Montgomery, Alabama	Active	
**Delta Iota Omicron**		University of the Virgin Islands	Saint Thomas, U.S. Virgin Islands	Active	
**Delta Iota Pi**		Middle Georgia State University	Macon, Georgia	Active	
**Delta Iota Phi**		National University	San Diego, California	Active	
**Delta Kappa Omega**	March 23, 2023	Marist University	Poughkeepsie, New York	Active	
**Delta Kappa Lambda**		Fresno Pacific University	Fresno, California	Active	
**Delta Kappa Xi**		Fort Valley State University	Fort Valley, Georgia	Active	
**Delta Kappa Rho**		East Texas A&M University	Commerce, Texas	Active	(Note: Chapter formed at Texas A&M University Commerce, which became East Texas A&M University in 2024.)
**Delta Kappa Sigma**		Herzing University	Milwaukee, Wisconsin	Active	
**Delta Kappa Upsilon**		Saint Mary's University of Minnesota	Winona, Minnesota	Active	
**Delta Kappa Psi**		St. Cloud State University	St. Cloud, Minnesota	Active	
**Delta Lambda Psi**		Southern Utah University	Cedar City, Utah	Active	
**Delta Lambda Omega**		Grand Canyon University	Phoenix, Arizona	Active	
**Zeta Eta Theta**		University of Phoenix	Phoenix, Arizona	Active	
**Eta Theta Iota**		Indiana Wesleyan University	Marion, Indiana	Active	
**Theta Iota Kappa**		Delaware State University	Dover, Delaware	Active	
**Kappa Lambda Mu**		Nazareth University	Pittsford, New York	Active	
**Lambda Nu Mu** (see Lambda Omicron)		Southern University	Baton Rouge, Louisiana	Active	
**Mu Nu Xi**		Rutgers University–Newark	Newark, New Jersey	Active	
**Rho Sigma Tau**		Colorado Mesa University	Grand Junction, Colorado	Active	
**Phi Chi Psi**		Barry University	Miami Shores, Florida	Active	
**Chi Psi Omega**		Fairfield University	Fairfield, Connecticut	Active	
		Cabrini University	Radnor Township, Pennsylvania	Inactive	(Note: Cabrini University closed in 2024.)
		College of St. Scholastica	Duluth, Minnesota	Inactive	
		Columbia University	New York City, New York	Inactive	
		Fairleigh Dickinson University	Madison, New Jersey	Inactive	
		Florida International University, Miami	Miami, Florida	Inactive	
		George Fox University	Newberg, Oregon	Inactive	
		Georgia Southwestern State University	Americus, Georgia	Inactive	
		Gwynedd Mercy University	Lower Gwynedd Township, Pennsylvania	Active	
		Indiana University–Purdue University Indianapolis	Indianapolis, Indiana	Inactive	(Note: In 2024, IUPUI was split into two separate institutions: Indiana University Indianapolis and Purdue University in Indianapolis.)
		Marian University	Indianapolis, Indiana	Inactive	
		Missouri Baptist University	St. Louis, Missouri	Inactive	
		Missouri State University	Springfield, Missouri	Active	
		Morehead State University	Morehead, Kentucky	Inactive	
		Nelson University	Waxahachie, Texas	Inactive	
		Point University	West Point, Georgia	Inactive	
		Purdue University Northwest, Westville	Westville, Indiana	Active	
		Regis College	Weston, Massachusetts	Active	
		Rowan University	Glassboro, New Jersey	Inactive	
		St. Joseph’s University New York	Long Island, New York	Inactive	
		Seton Hall University	South Orange, New Jersey	Active	
		University of Colorado Colorado Springs	Colorado Springs, Colorado	Active	
		University of Connecticut	Storrs, Connecticut	Inactive	
		University of Denver	Denver, Colorado	Active	
		University of Illinois Urbana-Champaign	Urbana, Illinois	Active	
		University of Massachusetts Global	Aliso Viejo, California	Active	
		University of Michigan	Ann Arbor, Michigan	Inactive	
		University of the Cumberlands	Williamsburg, Kentucky	Inactive	
		Washington Adventist University	Takoma Park, Maryland	Active	
	September 2021	West Virginia State University	Institute, West Virginia	Active	
		William Paterson University	Wayne, New Jersey	Active	
