= Church Street (Nashville, Tennessee) =

Street in Nashville, Tennessee, United States

- Location: Nashville, Tennessee
- East end: 1st Avenue North
- West end: 21st Avenue North

Church Street is a major thoroughfare in Nashville, Tennessee. It is home to several skyscrapers and buildings listed on the National Register of Historic Places.

== Location ==
It runs from Downtown Nashville at 1st Avenue North off the Cumberland River all the way down to Midtown Nashville at 21st Avenue North. At 21st Avenue North, it becomes known as Elliston Place, until the corner of West End Avenue and Centennial Park, off the campus of Vanderbilt University.

It is bisected by 1st Avenue North, 2nd Avenue North, 3rd Avenue North, Printers Alley, 4th Avenue North, 5th Avenue North, St Cloud Alley, 6th Avenue North, 7th Avenue North, U.S. Route 431, 9th Avenue North, 10th Avenue North, 11th Avenue North, 12th Avenue North, George L. Davis Boulevard, 14th Avenue North, 15th Avenue North, 16th Avenue North, 17th Avenue North, 18th Avenue North, 19th Avenue North, 20th Avenue North, 21st Avenue North.

== History and landmarks ==
The Downtown Presbyterian Church, successor to the First Presbyterian Church which moved to the suburbs in the 1950s, is located on the corner of Church Street and 5th Avenue North. It was first built in 1816 and it burned down in 1832. The present church building was built in 1848.

The Cheatham Building, located at 301-309, is a historic building listed on the National Register of Historic Places.

The Life & Casualty Tower is a skyscraper located at 401 Church Street; it was built in 1957.

The Fifth Third Center, located at 424 Church Street, was constructed in 1986.

The McKendree United Methodist Church is located at 523 Church Street. It has been there since 1833. The funeral of James K. Polk (1795–1849), who served as the 11th President of the United States, was conducted by Rev. John Berry McFerrin (1807-1887) inside this church. The church building was burned down several times: in 1879 and in 1905. The current building was constructed in 1910.

A pocket park called Church Street Park is located at 600 Church Street.

On June 9, 2001, the main Nashville Public Library was dedicated at 615 Church Street, in a building designed by architect Robert A. M. Stern.

The Castner-Knott Building, located at 616-618 Church Street, was built in 1906; it is listed on the National Register of Historic Places.

The Bennie-Dillon Building, built in 1926, is located at 700 Church Street, at its intersection with 7th Avenue North.

The Doctor's Building, located at 716 Church Street, was built in the Renaissance Revival architectural style in 1916; in 1921, three more storeys were added. It is listed on the National Register of Historic Places.

Several LGBT clubs/bars, Canvas, Tribe, and Play, are located between 15th Avenue North and 18th Avenue North. OutCentral, Nashville's LGBT Community center is also located in this area of Church Street.

Between 20th Avenue North and 21st Avenue North, there is the Saint Thomas - Midtown Hospital, a not-for-profit community hospital.

== Gallery ==
Landmark buildings on Church Street
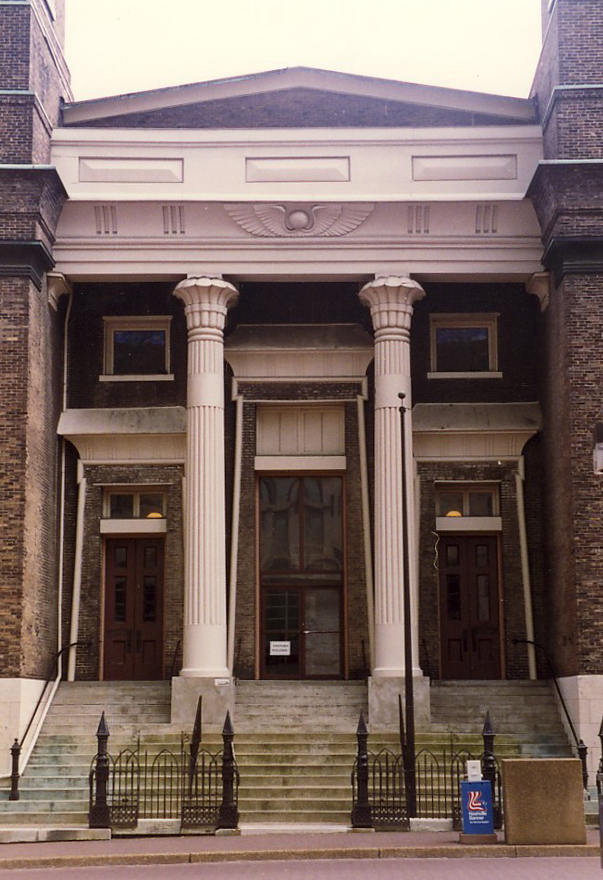
Downtown Presbyterian Church

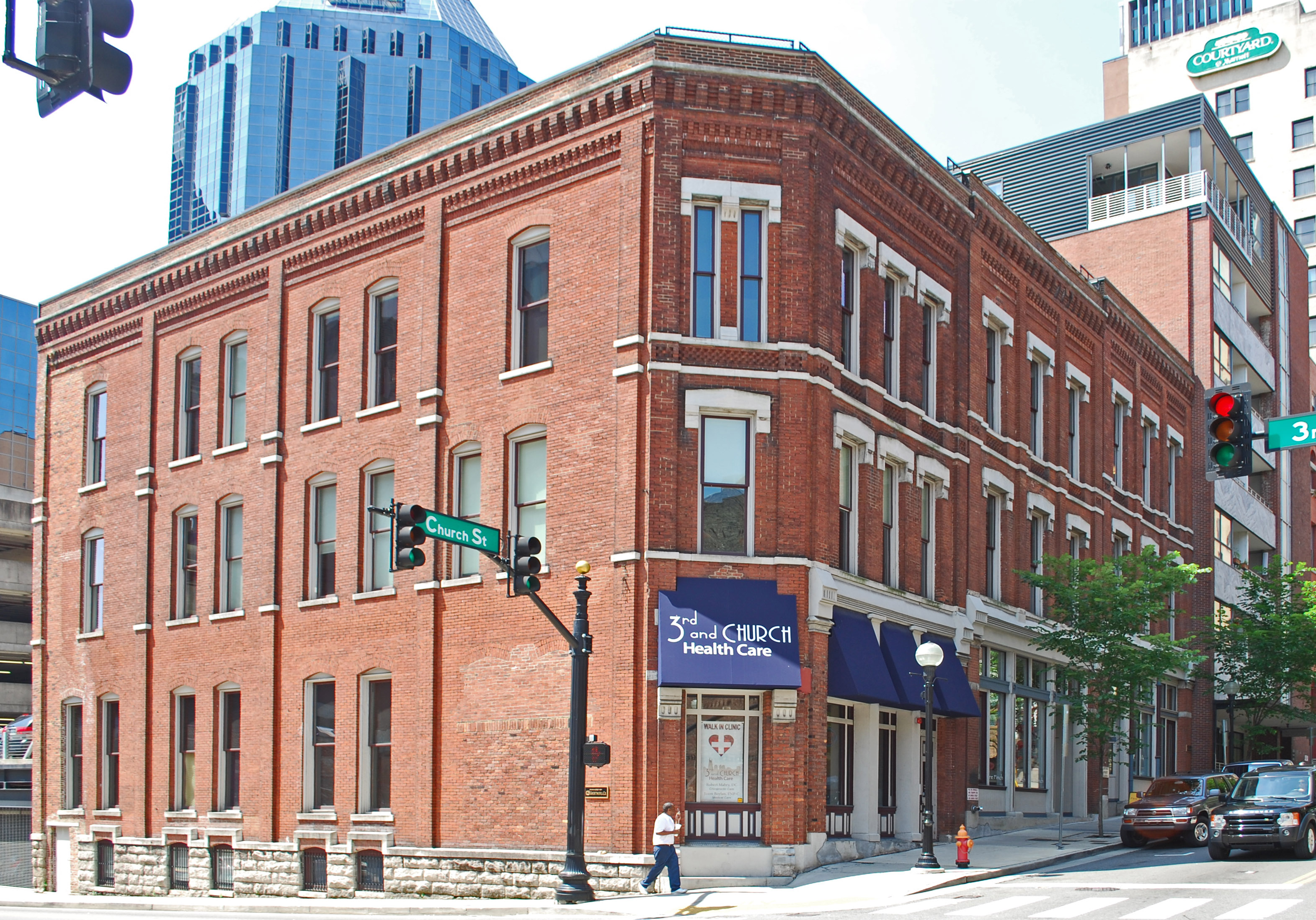
Cheatham Building

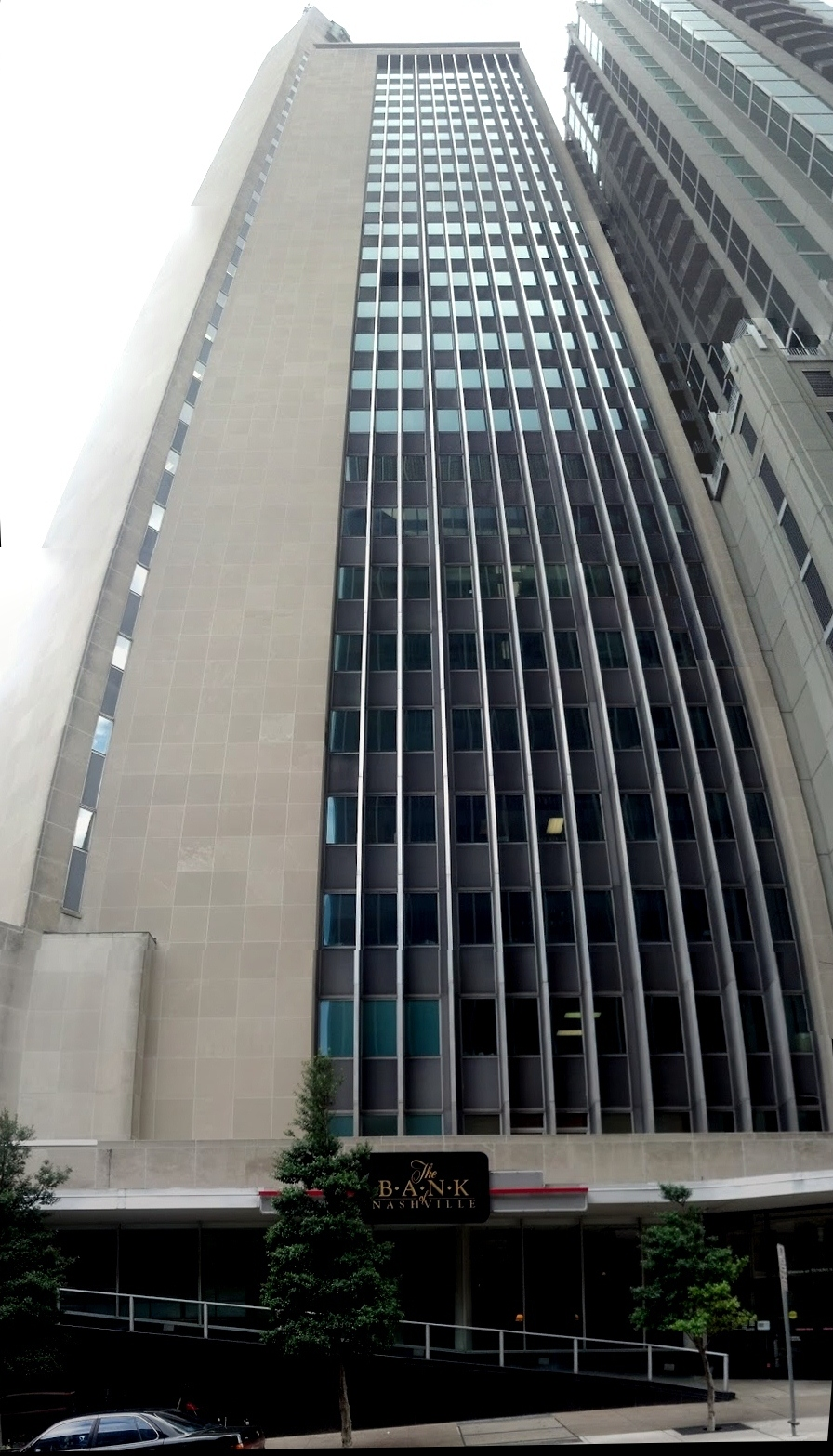
L&C Tower

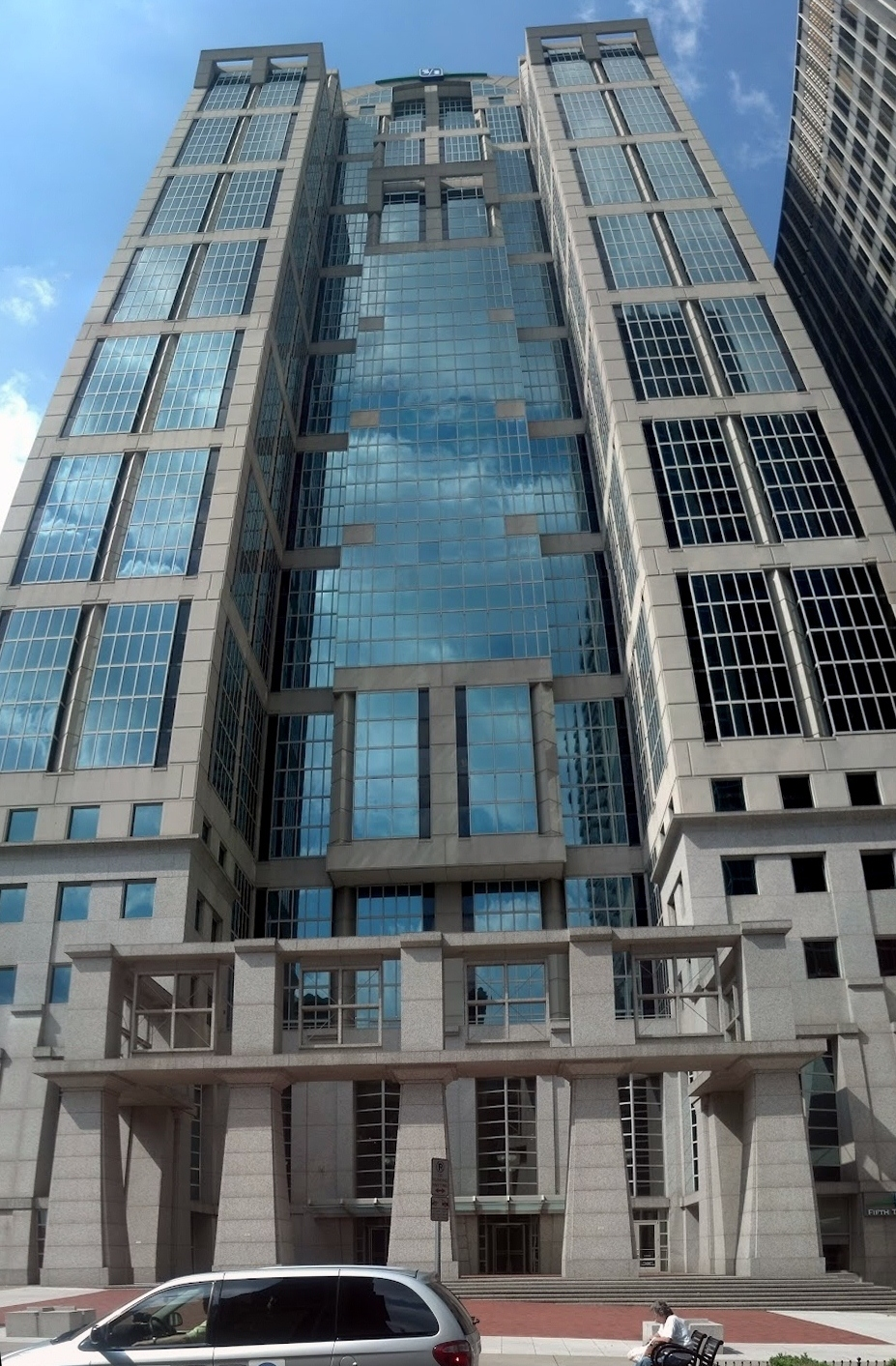
Fifth Third Center

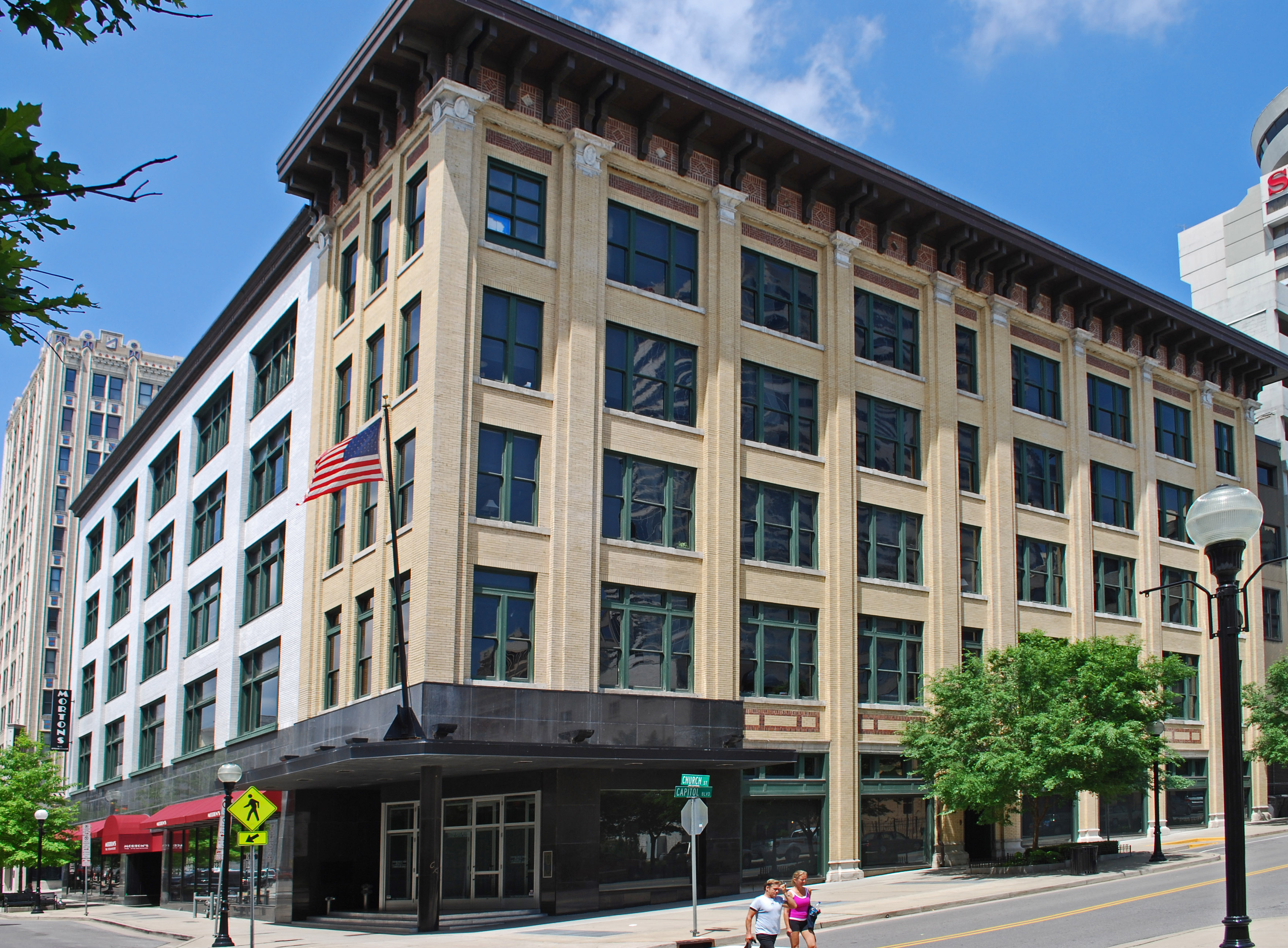
Castner-Knott Building

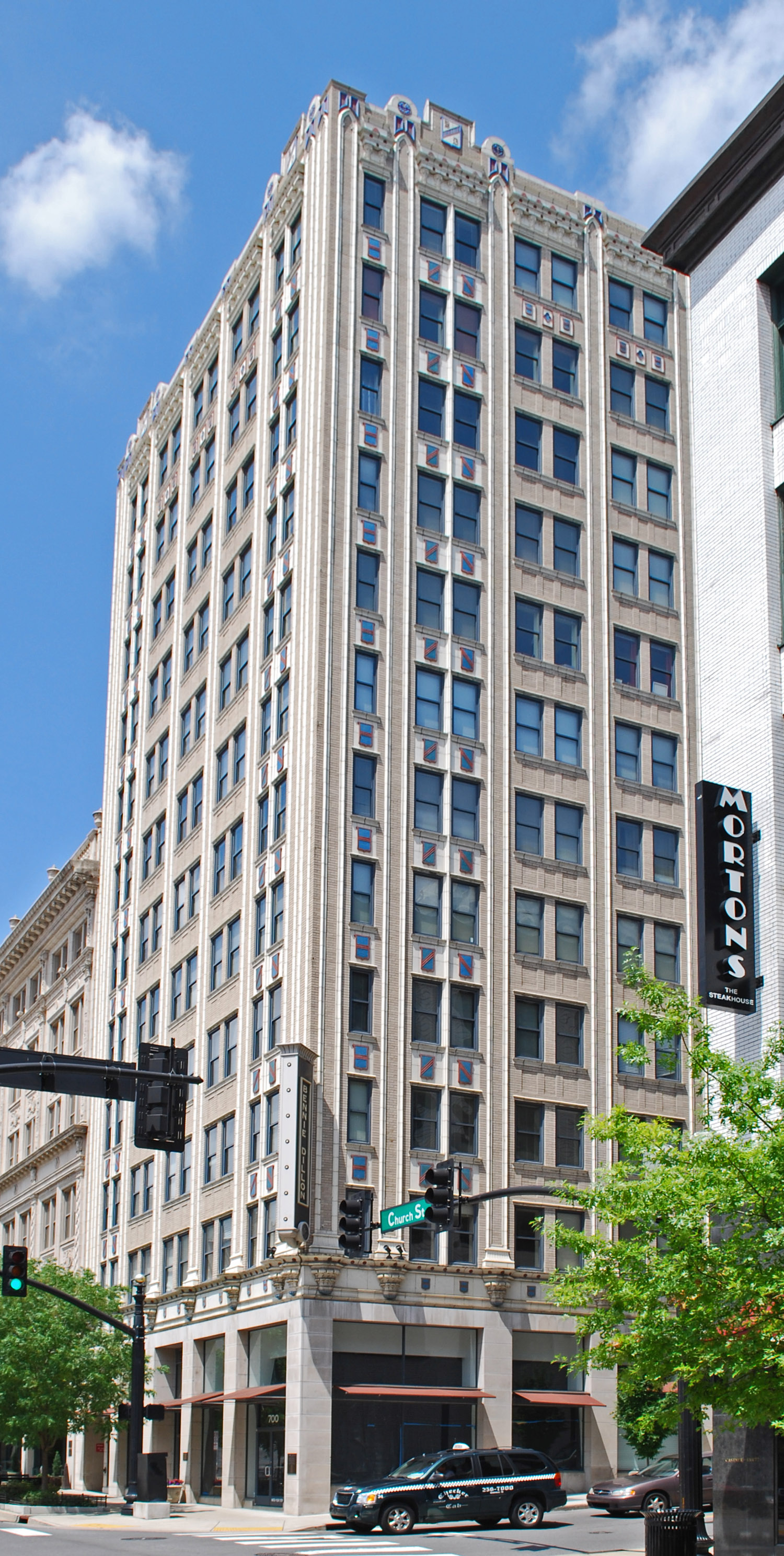
Bennie-Dillon Building

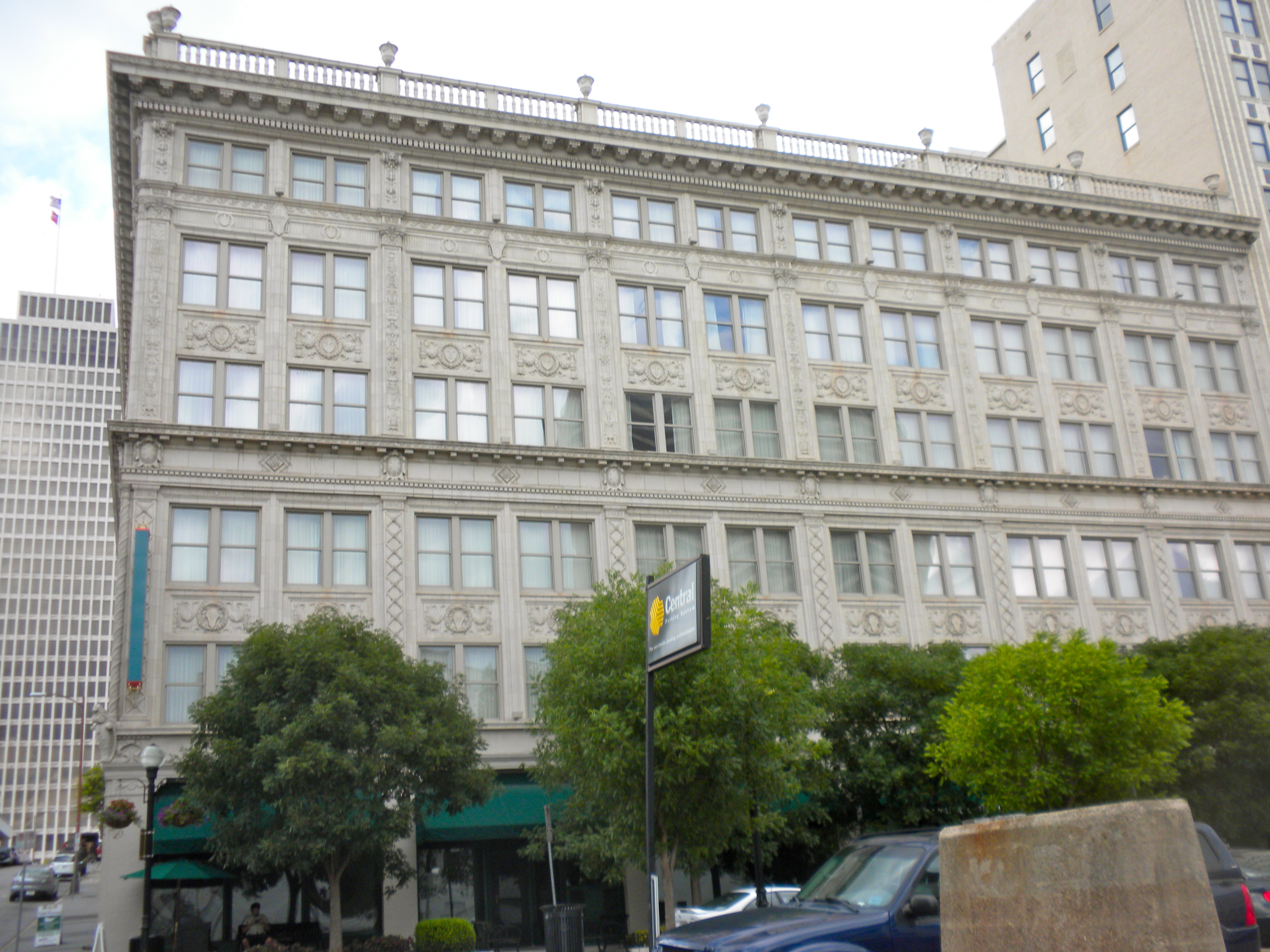
Doctor's Building
