= Castner–Knott Building =

- Caster–Knott Building
- U.S. National Register of Historic Places
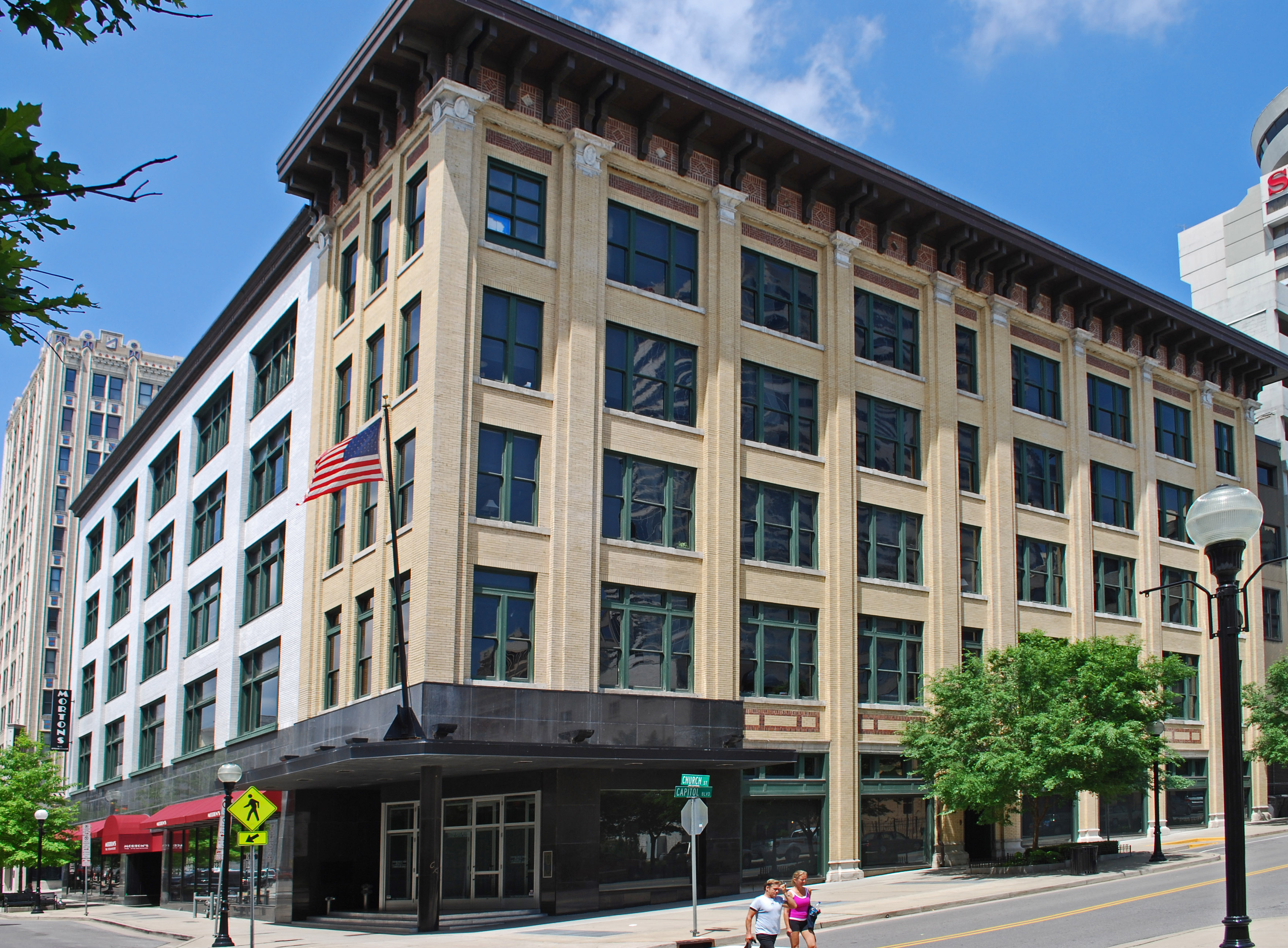
- Castner-Knott Building in May 2010

- Location within Tennessee Location within the United States
- Location: 616-618 Church Street, Nashville, Tennessee, USA
- Coordinates: 36°9′45″N 86°46′56″W
- Area: 0.5 acres (0.20 ha)
- Built: 1906
- Built by: Selden-Beck
- Architect: M.T McArdle
- Architectural style: Classical Revival, Moderne
- NRHP reference No.: 99000957
- Added to NRHP: August 20, 1999

The Castner–Knott Building is a historic building in Nashville, Tennessee.

== Location ==
It is located on the corner of Church Street and 7th Avenue North in Nashville, Tennessee, at 616-618 Church Street.

== History ==
The Castner–Knott Building was built in 1906 for Charles Castner and William Knott's Castner–Knott Dry Goods Company. Founded in 1898, the store moved from its original location on 5th Avenue in what was the start of the city's westward expansion along Church Street. At that time, Castner–Knott was a single five-story building with a 111-foot front at 618 Church Street. Castner–Knott leased a portion of the building at 616 Church in 1933, a separate five-story building constructed in 1911, with 28 feet fronting Church Street and as deep as the 618 Church building at 146 feet, adjacent to Capitol Boulevard. The top two floors were connected between 618 and 616 for Castner–Knott in 1936, the bottom three floors were connected in 1958–1959.

The complex was renovated in 1958–1959, with a small addition on the rear added in 1975. An additional renovation was completed in the late 1990s, after Castner–Knott closed its downtown store in 1996. The structure was added to the National Register of Historic Places listings in Davidson County, Tennessee on August 20, 1999.
