= Doctor's Building (Nashville, Tennessee) =

- U.S. National Register of Historic Places
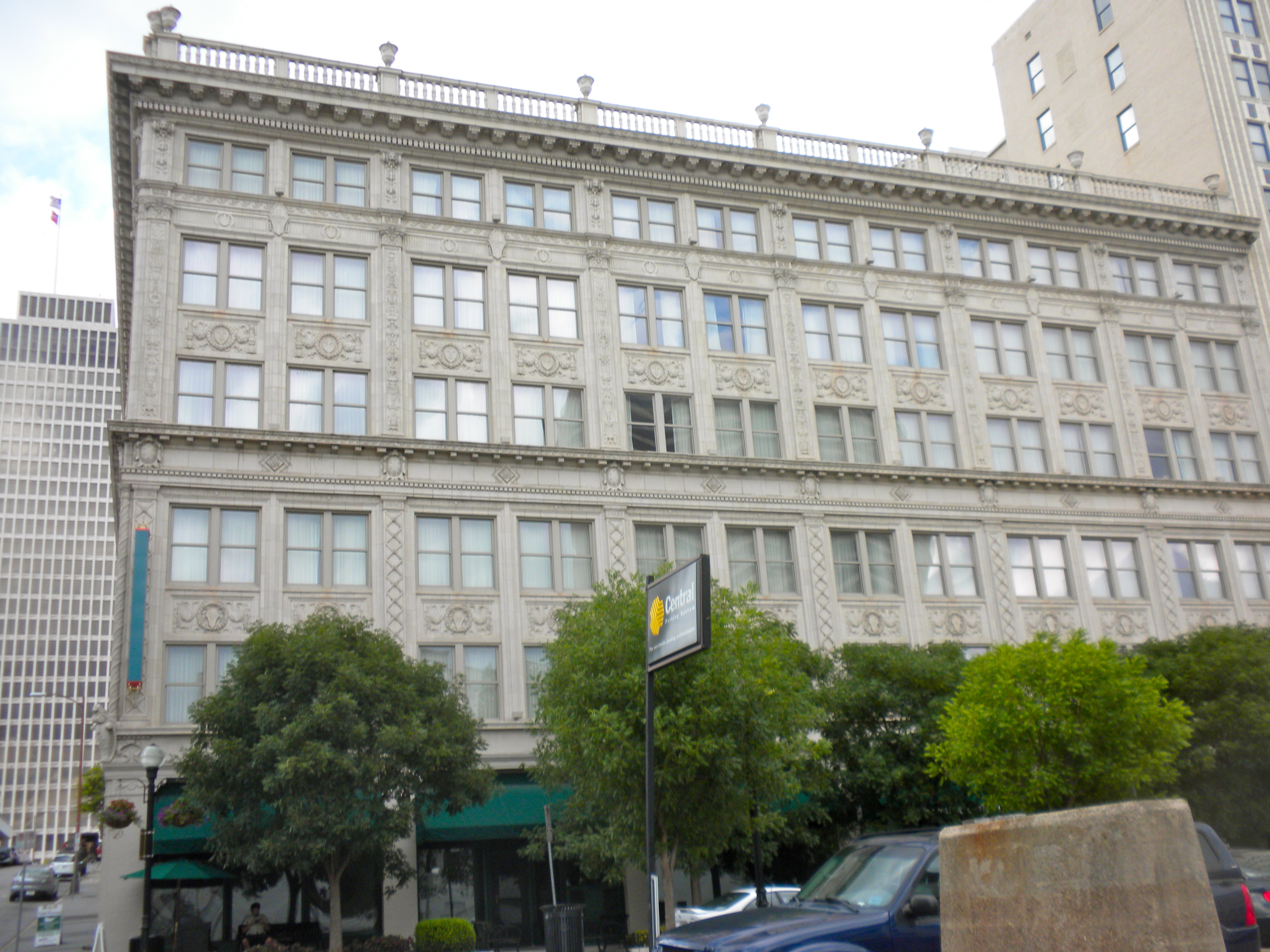

- Location within Tennessee
- Location: 706 Church Street, Nashville, Tennessee
- Coordinates: 36°9′44″N 86°46′59″W
- Area: 0.4 acres (0.16 ha)
- Built: 1910, 1921
- Architect: Dougherty and Gardner
- Architectural style: Renaissance
- NRHP reference No.: 85001607
- Added to NRHP: July 25, 1985

The Doctor's Building is a six-story commercial building in Nashville, Tennessee, United States, that was constructed in 1916 (some sources say 1910) and is listed on the National Register of Historic Places.

The building site was the former location of the home of railroad magnate Colonel Edmund William Cole, with his home being the last 19th-century mansion on Church Street. A new building, known as "The Doctor's Building" was then constructed as a three-story building, with medical offices on the upper floors, and retail shops on the ground floor. A few years later (in either 1916 or 1921), it had three more stories added, increasing its size to 100,000 square feet (9,300 m^{2}). The design, by architect Edward Emmett Dougherty of the architectural firm "Dougherty and Gardner" was of the elaborate Beaux-Arts or Renaissance Revival style. The exterior is sheathed with glazed architectural terracotta, restored by Ludowici-Celadon in the 1980s.

In the 1940s and 1950s, the building consisted of office space for many of the city's doctors and dentists.
