= Alexander Little Page Green =

American Methodist preacher

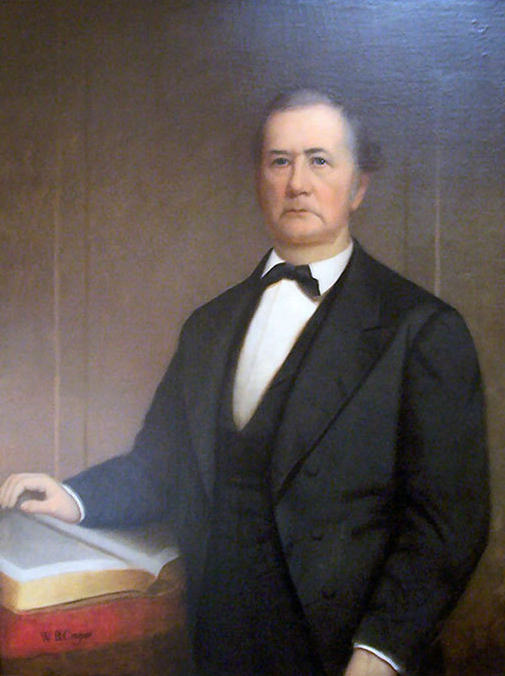
- Portrait of Green by Washington Bogart Cooper, c.1870
- Born: 1806 or 1807; Sevier County, Tennessee, U.S.
- Died: July 15, 1874; Nashville, Tennessee, U.S.
- Resting place: Mount Olivet Cemetery
- Occupation: Preacher
- Spouse: Mary Ann Elliston
- Children: Frank Waters Green; William Martin Green; Mary Anna Green Hunter
- Parent(s): George Green; Judith Spillman
- Relatives: Robert A. Young (son-in-law)

Alexander Little Page Green (a.k.a. "A.L.P. Green") (1806 or 1807 – July 15, 1874) was an American Methodist leader, slaveholder, and co-founder of Vanderbilt University. He was the founder of the Southern Methodist Publishing House. He was instrumental in moving the Methodist General Conference to Nashville, Tennessee, where he was the minister of McKendree United Methodist Church. He was an authority on fishing.

== Early life and education ==
Alexander Little Page Green was born in 1806 or 1807 in Sevier County, Tennessee. His father was George Green and his mother, Judith Spillman. He grew up in Alabama.

Green earned a D.D. in 1836 and an LL.D. in 1857.

== Career ==
Green joined the ministry of the Methodist Episcopal Church, South in Tennessee in 1824, at the age of seventeen. He was ordained as a deacon in 1826 and an elder in 1828 by Bishop Joshua Soule. He was elected to the Methodist General conference in 1831 and re-elected until he died. He was also a member of the Louisville Convention. He was in favor of lay representation in the church.

Green was a Methodist preacher for 50 years and a presiding elder for 36 years. He served as the first minister of the Nashville Station Church after it was renamed McKendree United Methodist Church in 1832 Nashville, Tennessee, established in 1787. He was succeeded by Rev. John Berry McFerrin. During the course of his ministry, Green carried medical pills and powders for sick patients, even though he did not have a doctor's license.

Green was one of the commissioners overseeing the lawsuit between the Southern and Northern Methodist Churches. He was the founder of the Southern Methodist Publishing House, and the chairman of the Methodist Book Committee. He was instrumental in establishing the Southern Methodist Publishing House at Nashville.

Green owned at least one slave named Philis, who died in 1853. During the American Civil War of 1861 to 1865, he supported the Confederate States of America. In September 1861, the Nashville Daily Patriot published an article suggesting Green had been appointed as Brigadier General of the Confederate States Army, though they added, "We trust it is nothing more than a rumor."

Green was one of the founders of Vanderbilt University in Nashville in 1873. As early as 1859, he was the president of the board of trustees of the Central University, its precursor before it received a donation from Cornelius Vanderbilt. From 1872 to 1875, he served as treasurer of its board of trust. He was also a trustee of the Nashville Female Academy (also known as the Old Academy), and the Tennessee Blind School.

Green was recognized as an "authority" on fishing, and he gave a lecture about it at the Tulip Street Methodist Church in 1874. He began writing a book about fishing before his death.

== Personal life, death and legacy ==
Green married Mary Ann Elliston (1817-1881), the sister of William Hiter Elliston (1819-1852), who served in the Mexican–American War of 1846–1848. They had two sons and two daughters:

- Captain Frank Waters Green, who served in the CSA during the Civil War.
- William Martin Green, who became a Methodist minister.
- Laura Green, who married businessman Thomas Duncan Fite.
- Mary Anna Green Hunter, who married Confederate Captain Robert P. Hunter, followed by Methodist minister Robert A. Young.

Green suffered from tetter for many years. He died on July 15, 1874, in Nashville, Tennessee, at the age of 76. He was buried in the Mount Olivet Cemetery in Nashville, where there is a monument in his honor.

His portrait hangs in the board of trust lounge of Kirkland Hall, the administrative building of Vanderbilt University. Moreover, the Alex Green Elementary School, located in Whites Creek, Tennessee North of Nashville, is named in his honor. His granddaughter, Julia McClung Green (1873-1961), was an educator; the Julia Green Elementary School in Nashville is named in her honor.

== Secondary source ==
- Green, William M. (1877). Summers, Thomas O. (ed.). Life and papers of A.L.P. Green, D.D. Nashville, Tennessee: Southern Methodist Publishing House. OCLC 656900150.
