= Cheatham Building =

- U.S. National Register of Historic Places
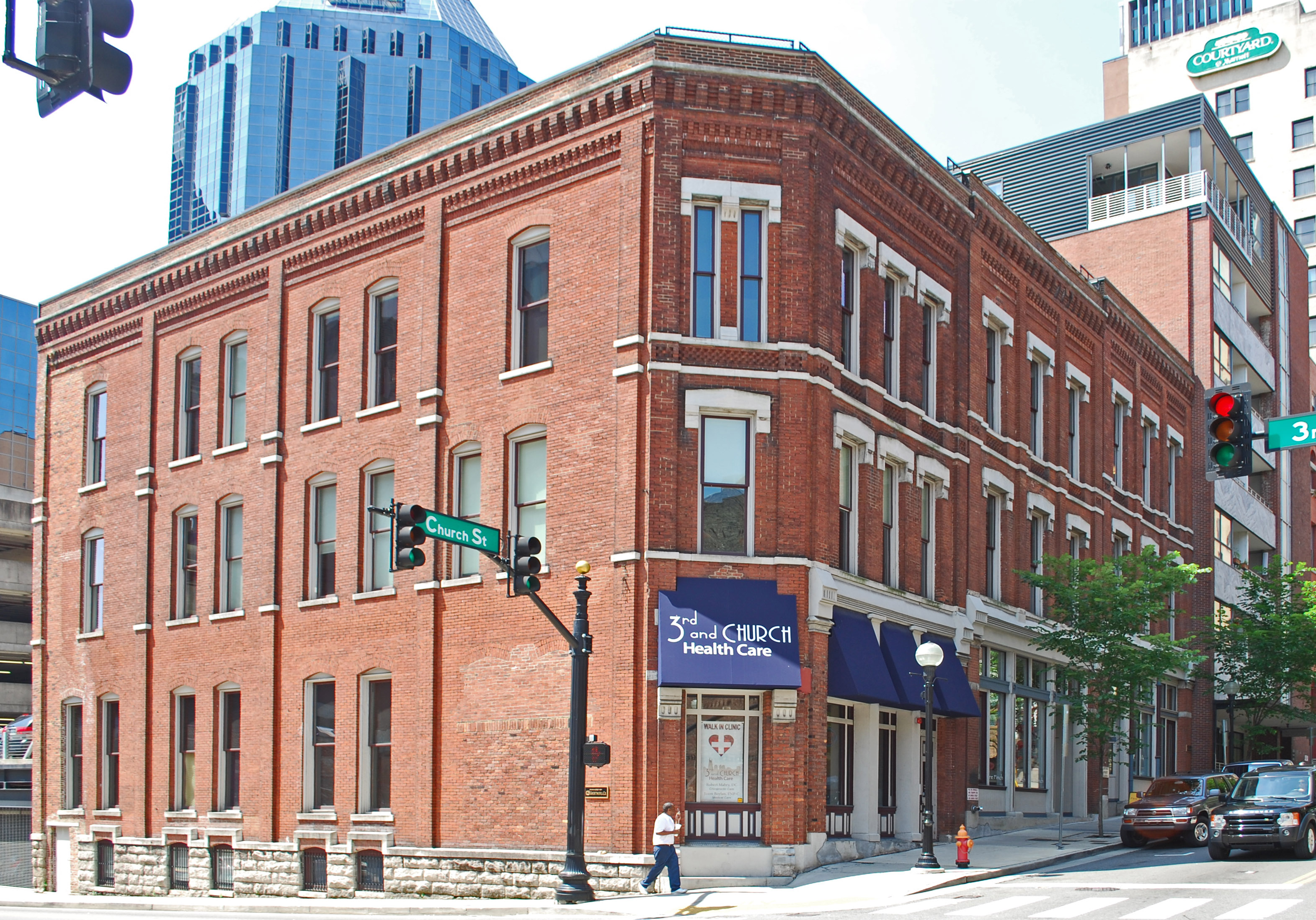

- Location within Tennessee Location within the United States
- Location: 301-309 Church St., Nashville, Tennessee
- Coordinates: 36°9′50″N 86°46′39″W
- Area: less than one acre
- Built: 1852
- Architect: Paul, Isaac
- NRHP reference No.: 80003787
- Added to NRHP: February 21, 1980

The Cheatham Building is a historic building in Nashville, Tennessee.

== Location ==
It is located at 301-309 Church Street in Nashville, Tennessee.

== History ==
It was designed by architect Paul Isaacs. It was originally used for commercial purposes.

It was listed on the National Register of Historic Places on February 21, 1980.
