= Nashville Convention =

1850 political convention in Tennessee

The Nashville Convention was a political meeting held in Nashville, Tennessee, on June 3–11, 1850. Delegates from nine slave states met to consider secession, if the United States Congress decided to ban slavery in the new territories being added to the country as a result of the Louisiana Purchase and the Mexican–American War. The compromises worked out in Nashville paved the way for the Compromise of 1850, including the Fugitive Slave Act of 1850, and for a time, preserved the union of the United States.

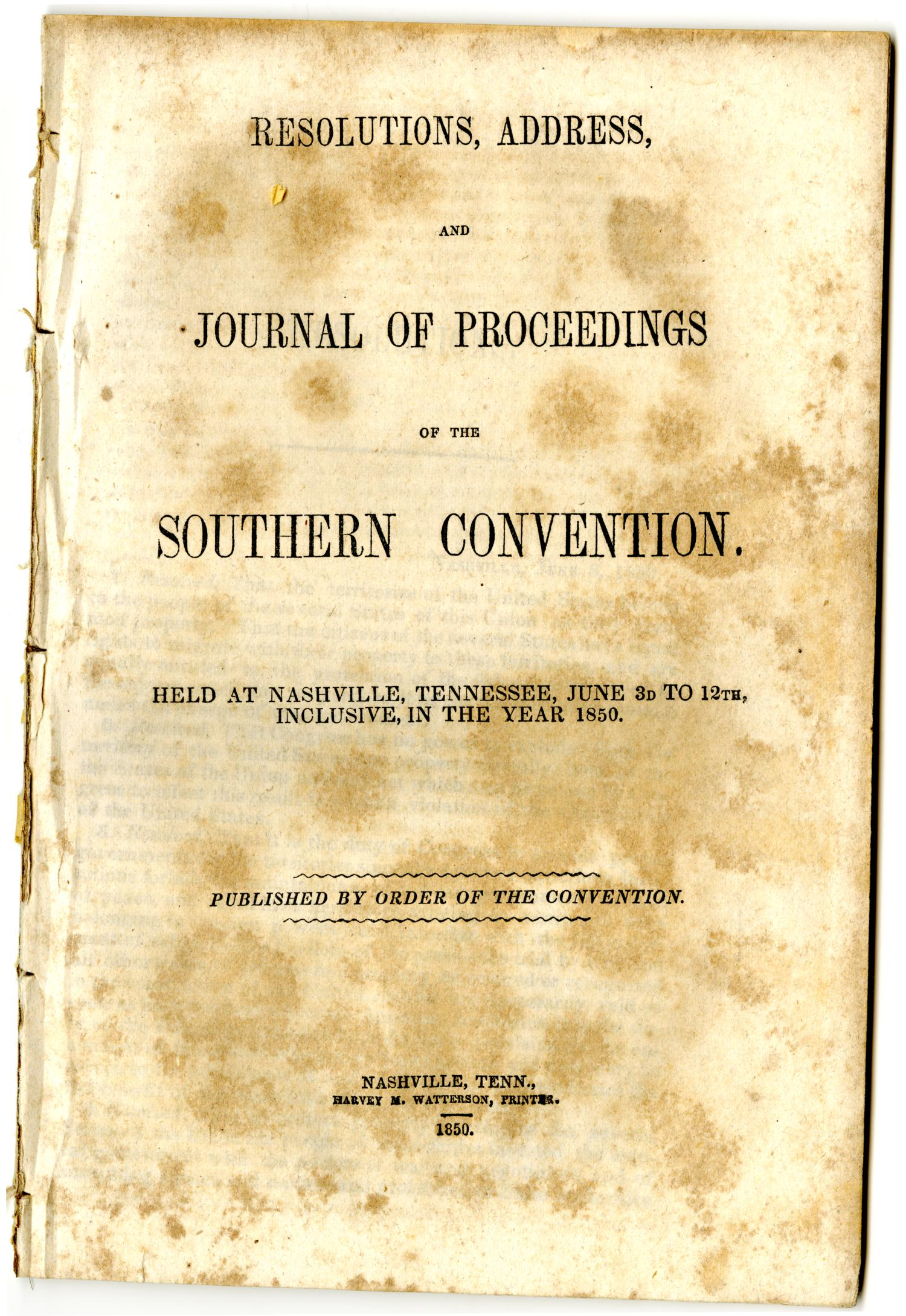
Proceedings of the Nashville Convention

The previous year, firebrand states rights advocate John C. Calhoun had urged that a preliminary bipartisan Southern convention be held in Mississippi to address the growing issue of the Federal government placing limits on the growth of slavery. The delegates to the October 1, 1849, Mississippi Convention denounced the controversial Wilmot Proviso, a failed proposal to ban slavery in the Mexican Cession, the land taken from Mexico at the end of the Mexican–American War. and the slaveholding states agreed to send delegates to Nashville to define a resistance strategy in the face of perceived Northern aggression. Mississippi's legislature appropriated $20,000 for the expenses of their Nashville delegates and $200,000 for any "necessary measures for protecting the state ... in the event of the passage of the Wilmot Proviso."

176 delegates from Virginia, South Carolina, Georgia, Alabama, Mississippi, Texas, Arkansas, Florida, Tennessee and Kentucky convened at the McKendree United Methodist Church in Nashville for nine days in June 1850. 101 of these delegates were from Tennessee, where each county had been allowed to send whomever it wished. In the other cases, the delegates were selected by the state legislatures. A small delegation from Louisiana had been blocked from attending by that state's moderate legislature.

After heated debate, the Southerners who urged secession if slavery were restricted in any of the new territories were eventually overruled by the moderates. Speaking for the moderate position, the presiding officer, Judge William L. Sharkey of Mississippi, declared that the convention had not been "called to prevent but to perpetuate the Union." Thus, the Nashville delegates, while they denounced Henry Clay's omnibus bill and reaffirmed the constitutionality of slavery in a series of 28 resolutions passed on June 10, agreed to a "concession" whereby the geographic dividing line designated by the Missouri Compromise of 1820 would be extended to the Pacific Coast. The convention adjourned without taking any action against the Union, and the issue of secession was temporarily tabled.

In September, the U.S. Congress enacted the Compromise of 1850, and President Millard Fillmore signed it into law. As a result, in November a smaller group of Southern delegates met in Nashville in a second session of the Nashville Convention, this time dominated by the extremists. They denounced the compromise and affirmed the right of individual states to secede from the Union. This second session had little national impact, but the seeds continued to be sown for the American Civil War.

Among the prominent pro-secession delegates at the Nashville Convention was Jefferson Davis of Mississippi, who would a decade later become President of the Confederate States. One delegate who supported the compromise was famed adventurer Sam Houston of Texas.
