= Elm Street Methodist Church (Nashville) =

Historic church in Tennessee, United States

- U.S. National Register of Historic Places
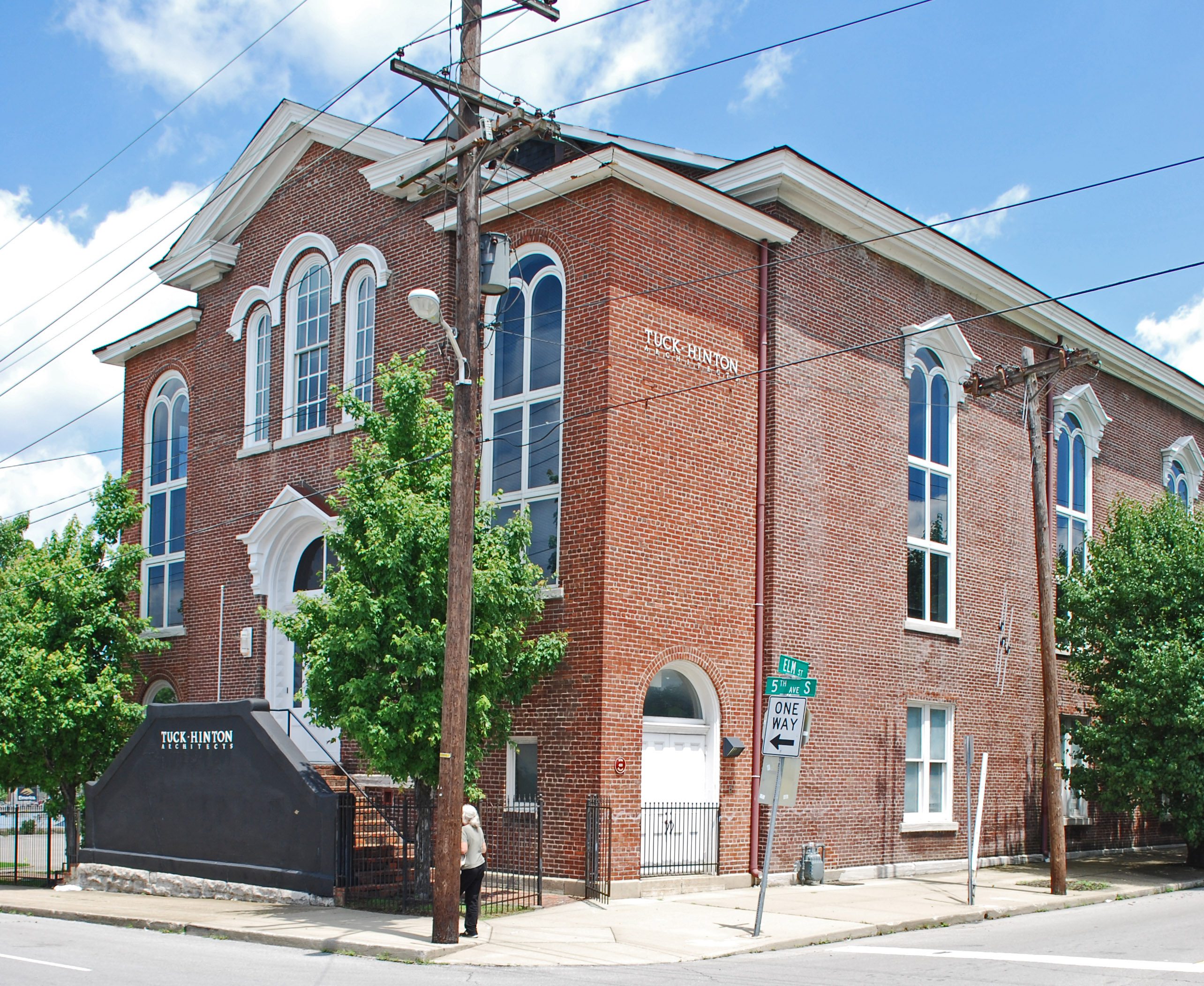

- Location within Tennessee Location within the United States
- Location: 616 5th Ave., S., Nashville, Tennessee
- Coordinates: 36°9′11″N 86°46′24″W
- Area: 0.3 acres (0.12 ha)
- Built: 1871
- Architectural style: Italianate
- MPS: Nineteenth Century Churches of South Nashville TR
- NRHP reference No.: 84003496
- Added to NRHP: May 15, 1984

Elm Street Methodist Church is a historic Methodist church building at 616 5th Avenue, South in Nashville, Tennessee. The building no longer serves as a place of worship and has been converted to offices. In 2019 it will be Bob Dylan's Heaven's Door whiskey's distillery and brand experience center.

It was built in 1871 in an Italianate style and was added to the National Register of Historic Places in 1984.
