= University of Tennessee at Nashville =

Defunct University of Tennessee branch campus

Coordinates: 36.163288°N 86.787642°W

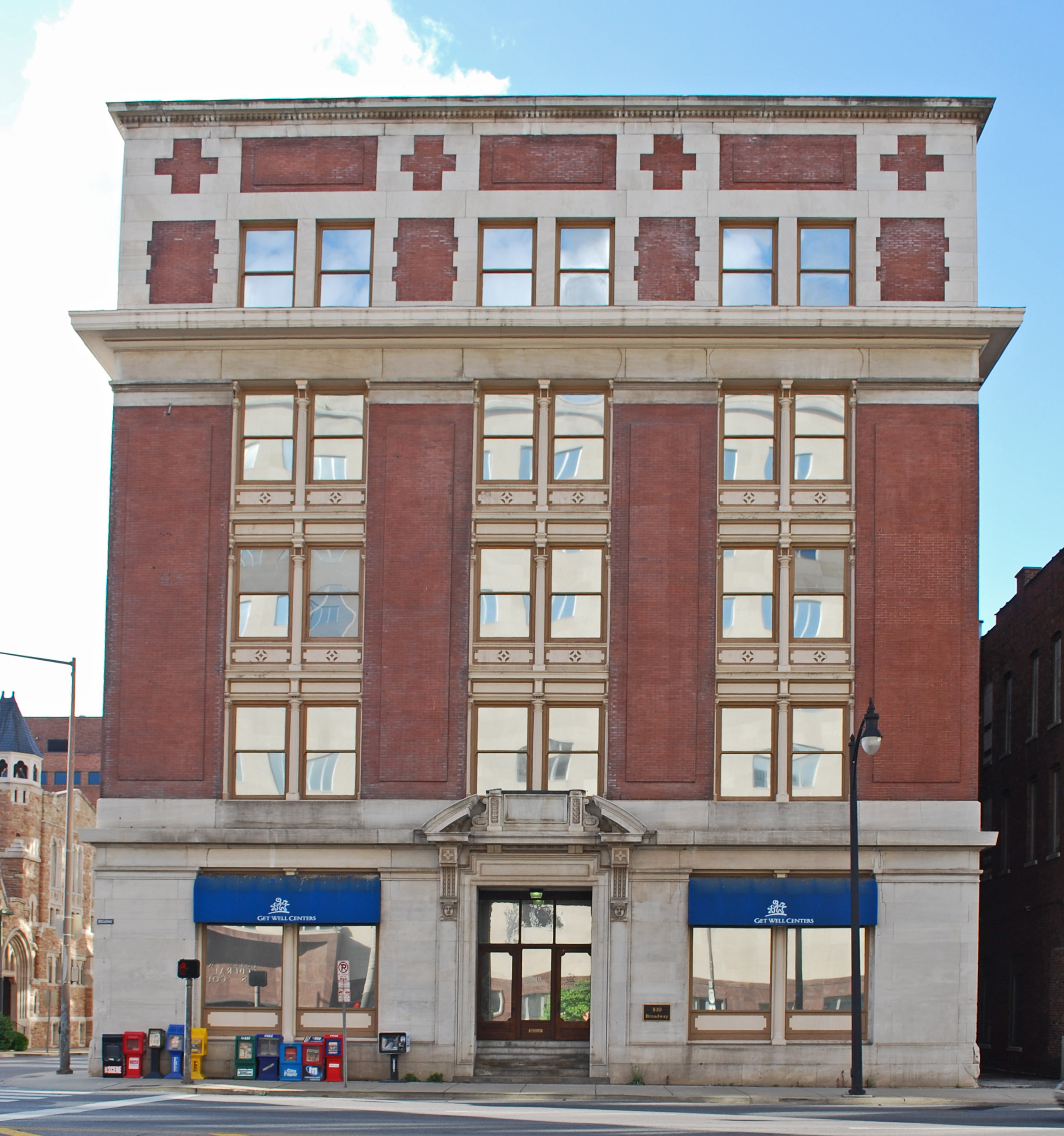
The Southern Methodist Publishing House building in Downtown Nashville, home to the University of Tennessee at Nashville from 1957 to the 1970s.

The University of Tennessee at Nashville was a branch campus of the UT system which existed from 1968 to 1979.

== History ==
The branch grew out of an adult education extension program which the University had operated in Nashville since 1947, and UTN remained focused on evening adult education throughout its life. UTN held true to its mission and offered only one program (nursing) before 4:30 in the evening. Even after limiting its educational offerings to six hours per evening, UTN still grew to a headcount of over 6000 students. The Division of Continuing Education was extremely popular with state, metro, and regional groups due to the wide variety of conferences and programs it offered. Equally popular was the Dean of Continuing Education, Dr. John Caruthers. The Chancellor was Dr. Charles Smith. Dean of Students was Dr. Bruce Hancock.

UTN held classes at the main building located at 10th and Charlotte, and at the Southern Methodist Publishing House, located at 810 Broadway. In a time when ADA compliance was still not an issue, the 10th and Charlotte Building contained elevators, ramps, and wheelchair access to almost all spaces.

When plans were announced to construct a freestanding building on Charlotte Avenue downtown to house an expanded UTN, concerns arose that the state was perpetuating a segregated system of higher education, since predominantly black Tennessee State University existed nearby. A decade of litigation ensued, ending in a court decision in 1977 which forced the merger of UTN into Tennessee State on July 1, 1979. The former UTN building was renamed TSU's Avon Williams campus.
