= Southern Methodist Publishing House =

- U.S. National Register of Historic Places
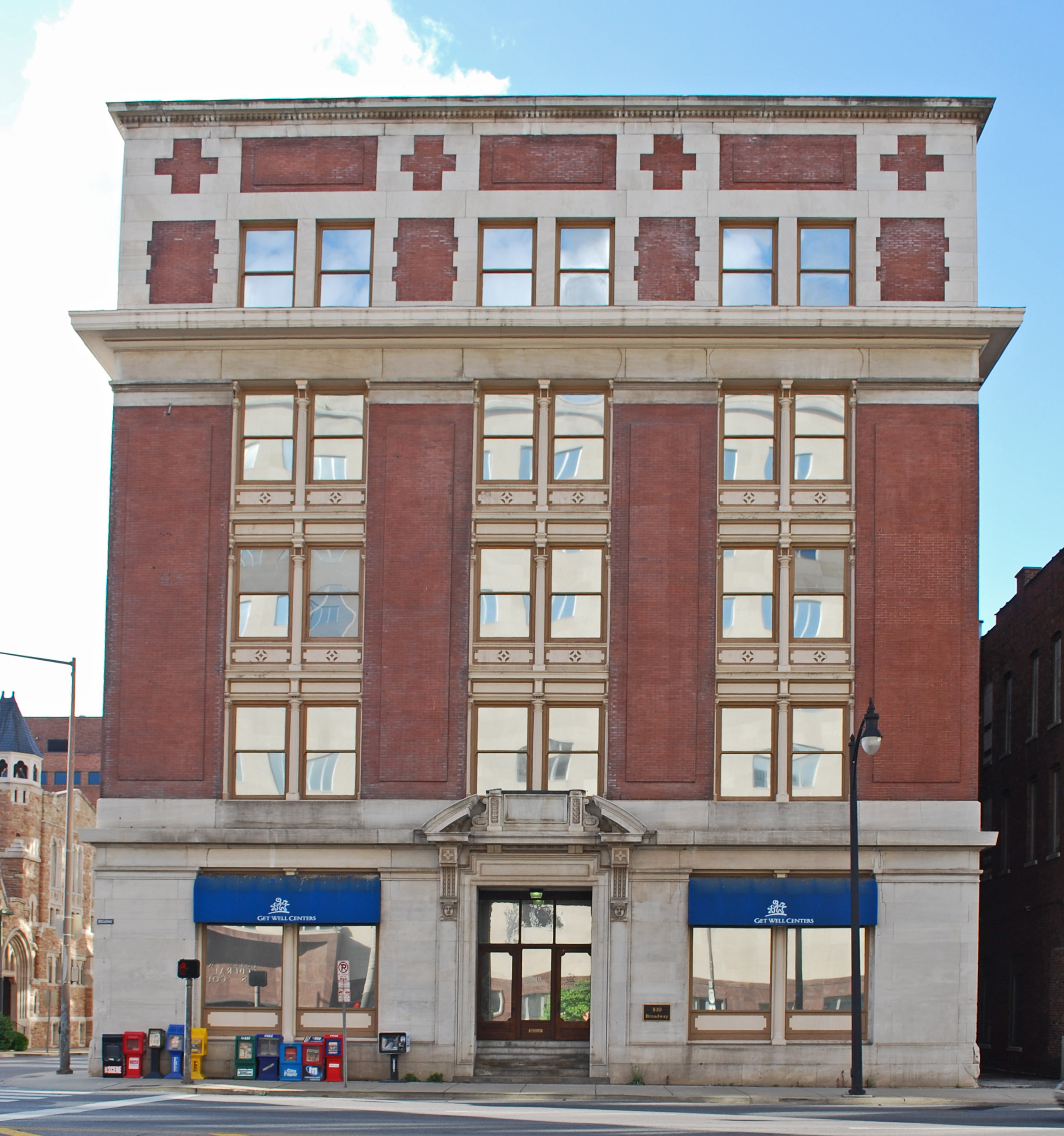
- The Southern Methodist Publishing House in 2010

- Location within Tennessee Location within the United States
- Location: 810 Broadway, Nashville, Tennessee, U.S.
- Coordinates: 36°9′32.8″N 86°46′58.3″W
- Area: 0.4 acres (0.16 ha)
- Built: 1906
- Architectural style: Commercial style
- NRHP reference No.: 84003519
- Added to NRHP: September 13, 1984

The Southern Methodist Publishing House is a historic building in Nashville, Tennessee, USA.

== Location ==
The building is located at 810 Broadway in Nashville, the county seat of Davidson County, Tennessee. It is located on the corner of Broadway and Ninth Avenue.

== History ==
The Southern Methodist Publishing House was first established by Reverend Alexander Little Page Green.

The five-storey building was completed in 1906. It was built with steel and concrete, with a limestone and brick facade. There is also a basement. It was designed in the Commercial architectural style, with Neoclassical finishes. It was built as a publishing house for the Methodist Episcopal Church, South.

In 1957, the building was converted into an annex for the University of Tennessee at Nashville. However, the university moved out of the building by the 1970s.

== Architectural significance ==
It has been listed on the National Register of Historic Places since September 13, 1984.
