= McKendree United Methodist Church =

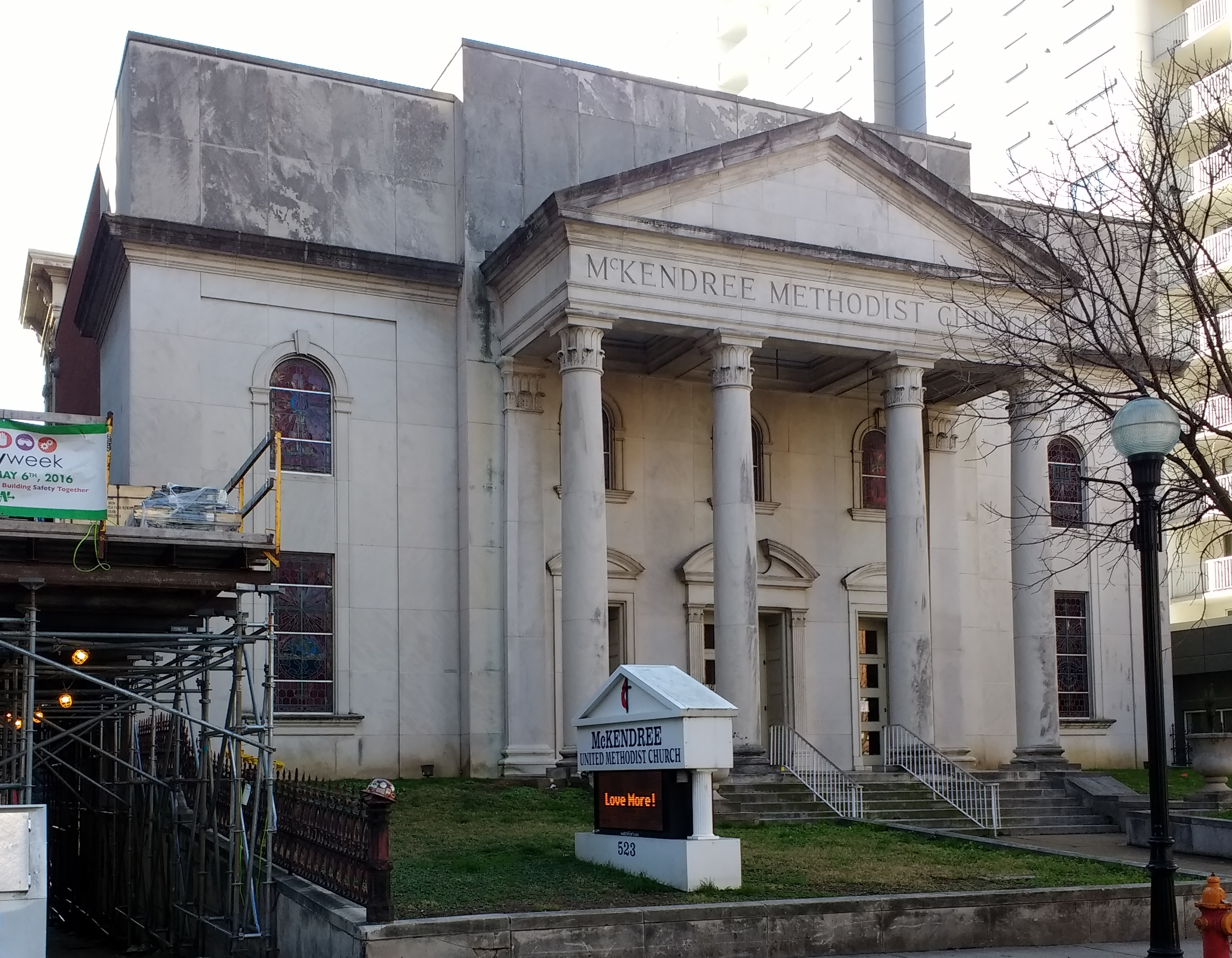
- McKendree United Methodist Church
- 36.1626°N 86.7808°W
- Location: 523 Church Street, Nashville, Tennessee
- Country: United States
- Denomination: United Methodist Church
- Website: mckendreenashville.com

Clergy
- Pastor: Stephen Handy

The McKendree United Methodist Church is a United Methodist church in Nashville, Tennessee.

== Location ==
The church building is located at 523 on Church Street in Nashville, Tennessee.

== History ==
The first building at its present location was constructed in 1833. It was named in honor of Bishop William McKendree (1757–1835), who dedicated the church building on November 23, 1834. Silversmith Joseph T. Elliston, who served as the fourth mayor of Nashville from 1814 to 1817, was one of its co-founders. It was the largest Methodist church in the United States at the time.

Alexander Little Page Green (1806–1874) served as its pastor, followed by John Berry McFerrin (1807–1887). The funeral of James K. Polk (1795–1849), who served as the 11th President of the United States, was conducted by Rev. McFerrin in this church.

In June 1850 the Church hosted the Nashville Convention, a meeting of delegates from nine Southern states to consider secession during the crisis that ultimately led to the Compromise of 1850.

During the American Civil War of 1861–1865, it was converted into a hospital. On January 29, 1879, a new church building was dedicated. However, on October 26, 1879, the church was burned down. In 1882, a new church was built. On July 4, 1905, the church building was burned down again. In 1910, the current church building was completed. In 1910, the Von Guerthler Art Glass Company added stained glass windows. In 1990, a Christian life Center was added to the rear of the church building.

== At present ==
The current pastor is Stephen Handy, starting in 2009 to present day. Services take place every Sunday at 9am and 11am.
