= John Berry McFerrin =

American pro-slavery Methodist minister (1807–1887)

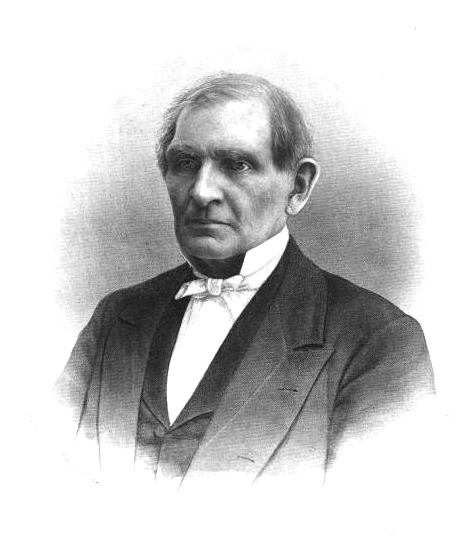
- Born: July 15, 1807; Rutherford County, Tennessee, U.S.
- Died: 1887 (aged 79–80); Davidson County, Tennessee, U.S.
- Occupation: Preacher
- Spouses: A. A. Probart; Cynthia T. McGavock
- Children: 8
- Relatives: John McGavock (father-in-law); James Henderson Berry (second nephew); Campbell Polson Berry (second nephew)

Signature
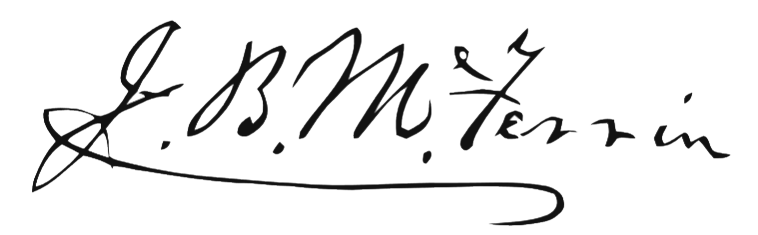

John Berry McFerrin (1807–1887) was an American Methodist preacher and editor. He served as a chaplain in the Confederate States Army during the American Civil War.

== Early life ==
John Berry McFerrin was born on July 15, 1807, in Rutherford County, Tennessee. His paternal great-grandfather, William McFerrin Sr., emigrated to York County, Pennsylvania, from Ireland in 1730. His paternal grandfather, William McFerrin Jr., served in the American Revolutionary War of 1775–1783, including at the Battle of Kings Mountain in 1780. His maternal great-grandfather, James Laughlin, emigrated to the United States from Belfast. His father, James McFerrin, was born in Washington County, Virginia, and served as a Methodist pastor in Bellefonte, Alabama. His mother, Jane Campbell Berry, was also born in Washington County, Virginia.

McFerrin grew up on a farm.

== Career ==
McFerrin started preaching in 1825 and became an ordained Methodist preacher in 1829. He delivered his first sermon in Tuscumbia, Alabama His other sermons were delivered in Franklin County, Alabama, Lawrence County, Alabama, and Limestone County, Alabama. He then served as a missionary, converting Native Americans to Christianity. Later, he preached in Huntsville, Alabama, Pulaski, Tennessee, and in Nashville, Tennessee. He then became a presiding elder in Florence, Alabama, and in Cumberland County, Tennessee. He became the pastor at McKendree United Methodist Church in Nashville. In the 1830s, he was one of the leaders of the temperance movement in Tennessee. When President James K. Polk (1795–1849) became ill, he converted him from Presbyterian to Methodist. He later conducted his funeral service. He also converted John Ross (1790–1866), who served as the Principal Chief of the Cherokee Nation from 1828 to 1866.

McFerrin was one of the early founders of La Grange College in Alabama, later known as the University of North Alabama in Florence, Alabama. As a result, he was honored by La Grange College with an honorary Doctorate in 1847. He also received an honorary Doctorate from Randolph–Macon College in Ashland, Virginia, also in 1847.

During the American Civil War of 1861 to 1865, McFerrin served as a Methodist chaplain in the Confederate States Army, converting soldiers to the Methodist Church. Specifically, he served in the Second Corps of the Confederate Army of Tennessee, under General Joseph E. Johnston (1807–1891). Indeed, he was a proponent of the slavery of African-Americans in the United States. However, his religious service during the war was not without controversy. In a letter to Governor Andrew Johnson (1808–1875) on April 22, 1862, Presbyterian lawyer Adrian Van Sinderen Lindsley (1814–1885) blamed him for encouraging secessionist activities in Nashville, as opposed to more moderate Methodists like Reverend Holland Nimmons McTyeire (1824–1889), Reverend John B. Somers (1801–1876), Reverend James L. Houston (1806–1888) and Alexander Little Page Green (1806–1874). He was also accused of trying to kidnap freed slaves, in an attempt to retrieve his lost slaves. He eventually surrendered, as the Confederate cause was lost. His estate was ruined by 1865.

McFerrin was a prolific editor of Methodist publications. He served as the editor of the Southwestern Christian Advocate from 1840 to 1844 and the Christian Advocate from 1855 to 1858. Shortly after the war, from 1869 to 1873, he edited the three-volume History of Methodism in Tennessee. He went on to serve as the manager of the Methodist Publishing House from 1878 to 1887.

In September 1881, McFerrin attended an Ecumenical Conference in London, England as a delegate of the Methodist Episcopal Church, South. During that trip, he conducted services not only in London, but also in Edinburgh, Dublin, Paris and Newcastle.

== Personal life ==
McFerrin was married twice.

McFerrin married A. A. Probart of Nashville, daughter of William Y. Probart and Sarah Probart, on September 18, 1833. They had five children:

- Sarah Jane McFerrin.
- James William McFerrin.
- John A. McFerrin.
- Elizabeth Johnston McFerrin.
- Almira Probart McFerrin.

She died in May 1854.

McFerrin remarried, to Cynthia T. McGavock of Nashville, daughter of John McGavock and Elizabeth McGavock. They had three children:

- Kitty Lou McFerrin.
- Mary McGinty McFerrin.
- Elizabeth McGavock McFerrin.

McFerrin was also a second cousin of James McFerrin Berry, father of James Henderson Berry (1841–1913), the 14th Governor of Arkansas, and to B.H. Berry, father of Campbell Polson Berry (1834–1901), a Congressman from California.

== Death and legacy ==
McFerrin died in 1887 in Davidson County, Tennessee.

The neighborhood of McFerrin Park, together with the public park called McFerrin Park, both located in Northeastern Nashville, are named in his honor. It was developed on the farmland formerly owned by him.

== Bibliography ==
=== Primary source ===
- John Berry McFerrin (ed.), History of Methodism in Tennessee (Nashville, Tennessee: Publishing House of the M.E. South, 1888).

=== Secondary source ===
- Oscar Penn Fitzgerald, John B. McFerrin: A Biography (Nashville, Tennessee: Publishing House of the M.E. South, 1888).
- William McFerrin Stowe, John B. McFerrin, Editorial Contraversialist, 1840-1858 (Durham, North Carolina: Duke University Press, 1935).
