= James G. Stahlman =

James Geddes Stahlman
- Born: February 28, 1893; Nashville, Tennessee, U.S.
- Died: May 1, 1976 (aged 83); Nashville, Tennessee, U.S.
- Education: Vanderbilt University
- Occupation: Newspaper publisher
- Spouses: Mildred Porter Thornton; Effye Chumley; Gladys Breckenridge
- Children: 2 daughters, including Mildred T. Stahlman
- Relatives: Edward Bushrod Stahlman (paternal grandfather)

James Geddes Stahlman (February 28, 1893 – May 1, 1976) was an American newspaper publisher and philanthropist. He was the publisher of the Nashville Banner. He was opposed to desegregation.

== Early years ==
James Geddes Stahlman was born on February 28, 1893, in Nashville, Tennessee. His paternal grandfather was Major Edward Bushrod Stahlman, a German-born railroad executive and the owner of the Nashville Banner, whose brother-in-law, Marcus Toney, was a Klansman and Masonic leader.

Stahlman earned his bachelor's degree from Vanderbilt University in 1916, and attended graduate school at the University of Chicago for a year. He served as an infantry private in the United States Army during World War I.

== Career ==
Stahlman began his career in journalism by working as a reporter for the Nashville Banner in 1912. He was the newspaper's co-owner with his uncle Frank Carl Stahlman from 1937 to 1955, when he became the sole owner. Stahlman wrote a column on the front page, From the Shoulder. Stahlman won the Maria Moors Cabot Prize in 1957.

Stahlman sold the newspaper to the Gannett Company in 1972, and he donated $5 million to the Vanderbilt University School of Medicine in 1972-1973.

== Desegregation ==
Stahlman served on the Board of Trust of his alma mater, Vanderbilt University, from 1930 to 1976. In 1960, he used the newspaper to publish misleading stories about Civil Rights leader James Lawson, which suggested Lawson had incited others to "violate the law" and led to his expulsion from the Vanderbilt University Divinity School. The school was placed on probation for a year by the American Association of Theological Schools, and the power of trustees was curtailed.

Stahlman was "strongly anti-integration". However, within a few years, "Stahlman was downplaying his racist rhetoric, boasting of hiring of a black reporter, and donating $250 to the families of black girls killed in a church bombing in Birmingham."

In 1967, Stahlman tried to keep Stokely Carmichael from speaking on the Vanderbilt campus; after Carmichael's speech on April 8, a racially charged riot broke out in North Nashville. Stahlman blamed Chancellor G. Alexander Heard for letting students invite Carmichael on campus.

== Personal life, death and legacy ==
Stahlman was married three times. With his first wife, Mildred Porter Thornton, Stahlman had two daughters, Mildred and Ann. Stahlman married his second wife, Effye Chumley, in 1939; she died in 1952, and he married his third wife, Gladys Breckenridge, in 1953.

Stahlman died on May 1, 1976, at the Vanderbilt University Hospital, after suffering a stroke at Rand Hall during a Vanderbilt Board of Trust meeting. One of his daughters, Mildred T. Stahlman, was a professor of pediatrics and pathology at Vanderbilt University. He is the namesake of the James G. Stahlman Professorship of American History at Vanderbilt University, currently held by Jefferson Cowie.
