= List of Freemasons =

This page provides links to alphabetized lists of notable Freemasons. Freemasonry is a fraternal organisation which exists in a number of forms worldwide. Throughout history, some members of the fraternity have made no secret of their involvement, while others have not made their membership public. In some cases, membership can only be proven by searching through the fraternity's records. Such records are most often kept at the individual lodge level, and may be lost due to fire, flood, deterioration, or simple carelessness. Grand Lodge governance may have shifted or reorganized, resulting in further loss of records on the member or the name, number, location, or even existence of the lodge in question. In areas of the world where Masonry has been suppressed by governments, records of entire grand lodges have been destroyed. Because of this, Masonic membership can sometimes be difficult to verify.

The list is divided into two parts:

- List of Freemasons (A–D)
- List of Freemasons (E–Z)

== See also ==
- List of Tennessee Freemasons
