= Grand Lodge Building (Tennessee) =

Building in Nashville, Tennessee, USA

Grand Lodge of Tennessee
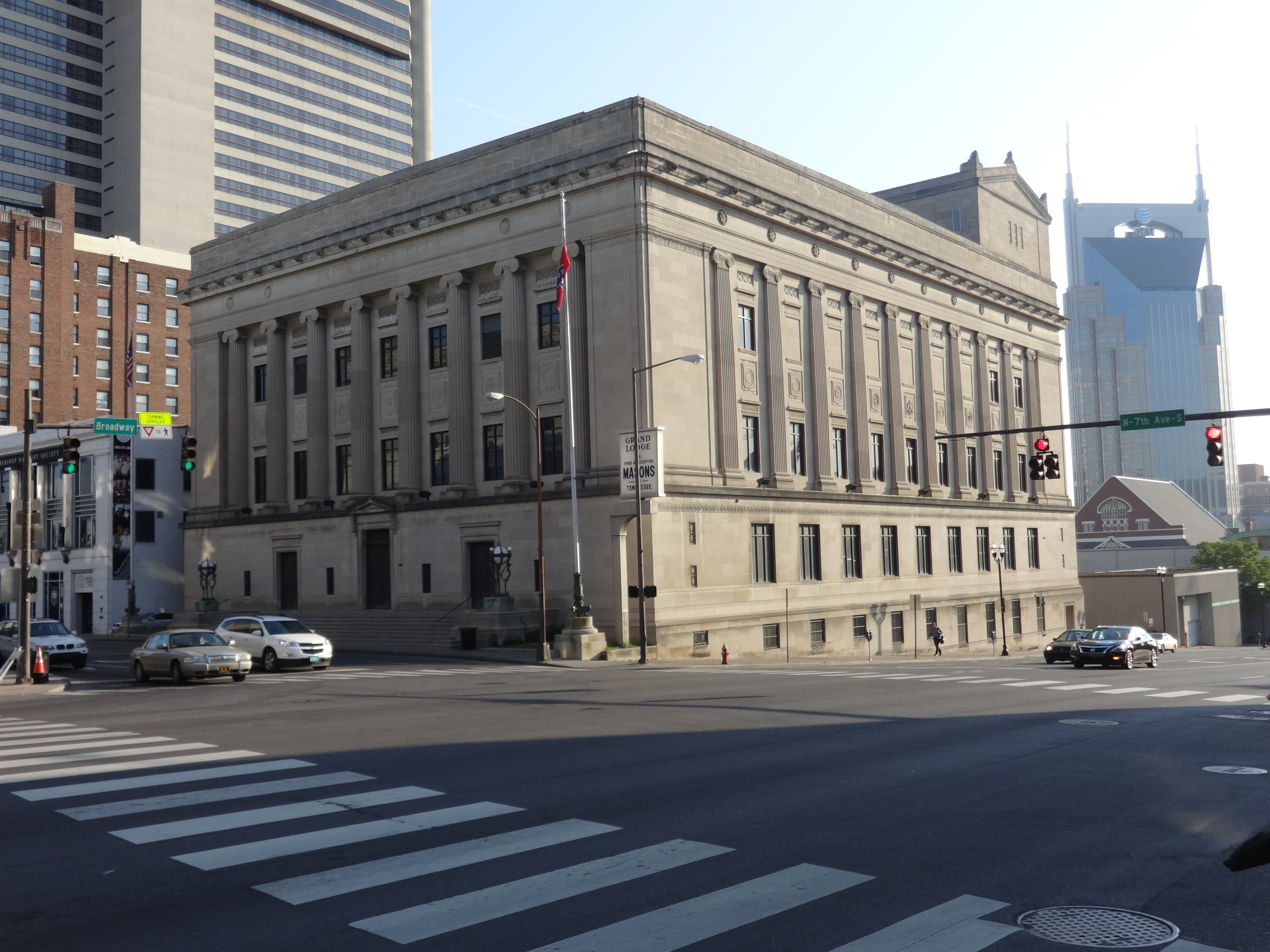
- The building in 2015

General information
- Type: Building
- Architectural style: Neoclassical
- Location: Nashville, Tennessee, 110 7th Avenue North
- Coordinates: 36.1598°N 86.7807°W
- Construction started: 1922
- Completed: 1925
- Owner: Grand Lodge of Tennessee

Height
- Height: 29.87m

Technical details
- Floor count: 5

Design and construction
- Architecture firm: Asmus & Clark

The Grand Lodge Building is a historic building at the intersection of Broadway and 7th Avenue in Nashville, Tennessee, U.S. It houses the Grand Lodge of Tennessee of Free and Accepted Masons. In addition to offices, meeting spaces, and a dining hall, the building also contains a Masonic library, museum, a large theatrical auditorium and stage, and a collection of portraits of all the Past Grand Masters of Tennessee.

== History ==
=== Previous Grand Lodge Buildings ===
The first Masonic building in Tennessee was Masonic Hall, completed in Nashville in 1825 and situated on Church Street. The cornerstone was laid June 24, 1818, and it was first occupied in 1823. Masonic Hall was a two-story brick building with a large hall on the first floor, and smaller apartments on the second floor for use by lodges and the Holy Royal Arch Chapter. The Tennessee General Assembly met in Masonic Hall from 1824 until 1853 when it moved into the Tennessee State Capitol. Masonic Hall burned in 1856. The temple was rebuilt as a five-story building, but the construction met considerable delays, particularly during the Civil War.

In 1909, the Grand Lodge and the Grand Chapter purchased property at 306 Seventh Avenue North in Nashville for building a new temple. Freemasons' Hall was completed and dedicated on March 8, 1911.

=== Current Building ===
At the 1920 Annual Communication of the Grand Lodge, it was reported that the state was intending to use the site of Freemasons' Hall for its planned War Memorial Building. As a result, the Grand Lodge would need to either sell the building or it would likely be condemned. The building was sold in 1921 for $84,000, retaining occupancy of the building rent-free until March 1, 1922.

At that time, the Nashville Scottish Rite bodies had been purchasing land to build their own building. The Scottish Rite bodies purchased seven lots on the corner of Seventh Avenue and Broadway, and began construction in 1923. The Grand Lodge and Grand Chapter used the proceeds of the sale of Freemasons' Hall to invest in Scottish Rite Temple bonds. The Grand Lodge and Grand Chapter both rented office space from the Scottish Rite.

The twelve-story building was completed in 1925 with the name "Scottish Rite Temple." In 1929, the Grand Lodge began investigating the possibility of ownership or joint ownership of the building as the Scottish Rite began to face financial difficulties amid the Great Depression. In 1935, the Scottish Rite underwent foreclosure on the building, and the building was purchased by the Grand Lodge through the Chancery Court on May 20, 1937, for $150,000. Since then, the Scottish Rite has rented space from the Grand Lodge.

== Architectural significance ==
The building was designed in Neoclassical style by Nashville architects Asmus and Clark. The structure is basically a cube, faced with engaged Ionic columns, pilaster and cornice, set above a massive base. The roof structure is in the form of a Greek temple, demonstrating the ability of Beaux-arts architects of the period to employ classicism in innovative ways. Asmus also designed the Home for Aged Masons, built in 1913.
