= Edward Bushrod Stahlman =

American railroad executive, newspaper publisher

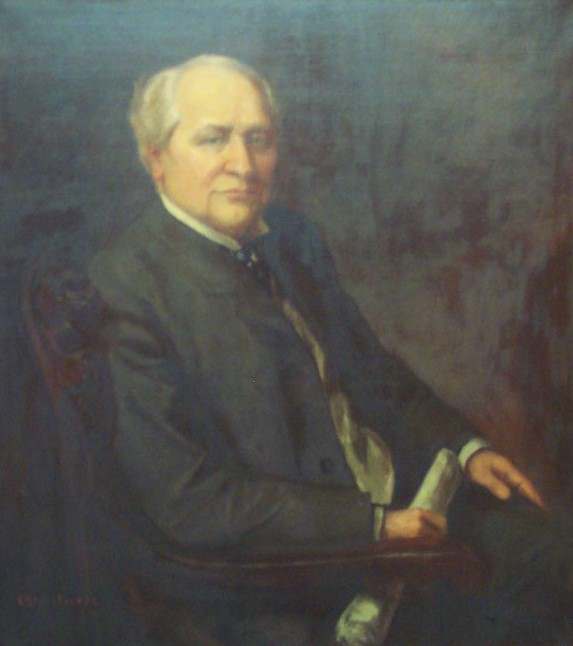
- Portrait of Stahlman by Charles Hoover
- Born: Friedrick Heinrich Eduard Stahlmann; September 2, 1843; Güstrow, Mecklenburg, Germany
- Died: August 12, 1930 (aged 86); Nashville, Tennessee, U.S.
- Resting place: Mount Olivet Cemetery
- Occupation(s): Railroad executive, newspaper publisher, real estate investor
- Spouses: Mollie T. Claiborne; Sarah Shelton
- Children: 4
- Relatives: Marcus B. Toney (brother-in-law); James Geddes Stahlman (grandson); Mildred T. Stahlman (great-granddaughter)

Edward Bushrod Stahlman (September 2, 1843 – August 12, 1930) was an American railroad executive, newspaper publisher and real estate investor. He was the vice president of the Louisville and Nashville Railroad and the Louisville, New Albany and Chicago Railroad. He built The Stahlman, a skyscraper in Nashville, Tennessee, and he was the publisher of the Nashville Banner for 44 years.

== Early life ==
Edward Bushrod Stahlman was born as Friedrick Heinrich Eduard Stahlmann on September 2, 1843, in Güstrow, Germany. Stahlman and his family emigrated to the United States, settling in West Union, Virginia. He had seven siblings. One of his sisters married Marcus B. Toney, a Klansman and Masonic leader.

== Career ==
During the American Civil War, Stahlman worked as a railroad builder near Gallatin, Tennessee, only to become a clerk shortly after. He was subsequently hired as an auditor by the Southern Express Company in the twin city of Bristol, Tennessee-Bristol, Virginia, and he settled in Nashville, Tennessee in 1866. Stahlman joined the Louisville and Nashville Railroad in 1871 as a "contracting freight agent". By 1878, he became a "general freight agent", and he was later promoted to "general traffic manager." From 1885 to 1890, he served as its vice president. He also served as the vice president of the Louisville, New Albany and Chicago Railroad, and he was a commissioner of the Southern Steamship and Railway Association.

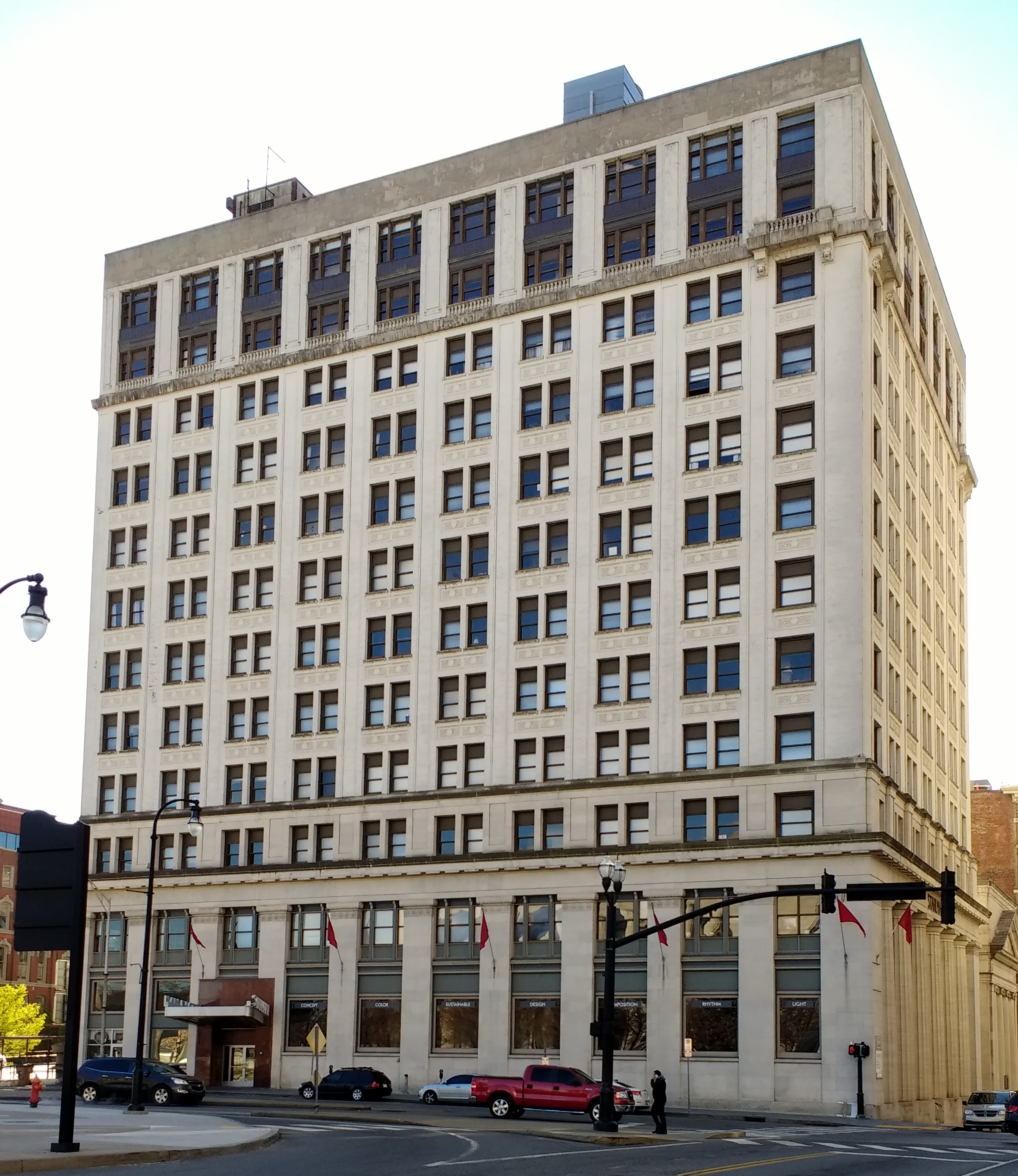
The Stahlman.

Stahlman purchased the Nashville Banner in 1885. He was its publisher for the next 44 years of his life. In 1907, Luke Lea launched The Tennessean, a competing newspaper in Nashville. According to the Tennessee Encyclopedia of History and Culture, "Lea and his political associates conspired unsuccessfully to have the German-born Major Stahlman declared an "alien enemy" after World War I began." Stahlman's obituary in The Tennessean highlighted, "From a small and modest paper, with little influence and small circulation in the late '80s, it became under the direction of Major Stahlman one of the leading and outstanding newspapers of the South."

Politically, Stahlman was responsible for lowering the cost of "postal rates" for newspapers through his involvement with the Southern Newspaper Publishers' Association. He was also a supporter of Cordell Hull.

Stahlman invested in real estate in Nashville. He purchased the Nashville Union Stockywards in 1881. He built The Stahlman, a skyscraper in Nashville, in 1906.

== Death ==
Stahlman married Mollie T. Claiborne in 1866 and they had three children. After she predeceased him in 1915, he married Sarah Shelton, and they had a child. Stahlman was a 32nd degree Mason, and a charter member of the Masonic Widows' and Orphans' Home. He was also a member of the Methodist Episcopal Church, South.

Stahlman died of "overwork" on August 12, 1930, in Nashville, Tennessee, aged 87. His funeral was held at the McKendree Methodist Church, later known as the West End United Methodist Church, and he was buried at Mount Olivet Cemetery. His portrait hangs in the Nashville Public Library.
