= Mildred T. Stahlman =

American neonatologist and academic (1922–2024)

- Born: July 31, 1922; Nashville, Tennessee, U.S.
- Died: June 29, 2024 (aged 101); Brentwood, Tennessee, U.S.
- Education: Vanderbilt University School of Medicine
- Awards: John Howland Award (1996)
- Scientific career
- Fields: Neonatology, Pathology
- Workplaces: Vanderbilt University

Mildred Thornton Stahlman (July 31, 1922 – June 29, 2024) was an American neonatologist and academic. She worked as a professor of pediatrics and pathology at Vanderbilt University in Nashville, Tennessee.

== Early life ==
Mildred T. Stahlman was born on July 31, 1922, in Nashville, Tennessee. Her father, James Geddes Stahlman, was a Tennessee newspaper publisher and was a trustee of Vanderbilt University. Her paternal great-grandfather, Major Edward Bushrod Stahlman, was a German-born railroad executive, the owner of the Nashville Banner, and the developer of The Stahlman.

A graduate of Ward-Belmont Preparatory School and Ward-Belmont College for Women, Stahlman went on to graduate from the Vanderbilt University College of Arts and Science in 1943 and earn her M.D. from the Vanderbilt University School of Medicine in 1946.

== Career ==
Stahlman worked as an intern at the Lakeside Hospital in Cleveland, Ohio, from 1946 to 1947 and as a pediatric intern at Boston Children's Hospital from 1947 to 1948. She then served as Assistant Resident at the Pediatric Service of the Vanderbilt University Medical Center from 1948 to 1948, and later as a cardiac resident at La Rabida Sanitarium and Exchange Fellow at Royal Caroline Institute in Stockholm, Sweden.

She spent the rest of her career at the Vanderbilt University School of Medicine.

Stahlman started the first newborn intensive care unit in the world, in order to use respiratory therapy for infants with damaged lungs. In addition, she researched methods to prevent and treat disease, developed overseas fellowship exchange programs, and initiated the Angel Transport mobile intensive-care unit for newborns. She was an author on more than 100 peer-reviewed articles on neonatal care, focusing on the care of premature infants. Her publications include several papers on ethical and moral issues concerning extreme low birth rate infants.

She received the Neonatal-Perinatal Medicine certification from the American Board of Pediatrics and the Pediatrics certification from the American Board of Pediatrics. Additionally, she received the American Pediatric Society's highest honor, the John Howland Award in 1996. Stahlman celebrated her 90th birthday in 2012, and turned 100 on July 31, 2022.

== Death ==
Stahlman died in Brentwood, Tennessee, on June 29, 2024, at the age of 101.
