= Bennie–Dillon Building =

- U.S. National Register of Historic Places
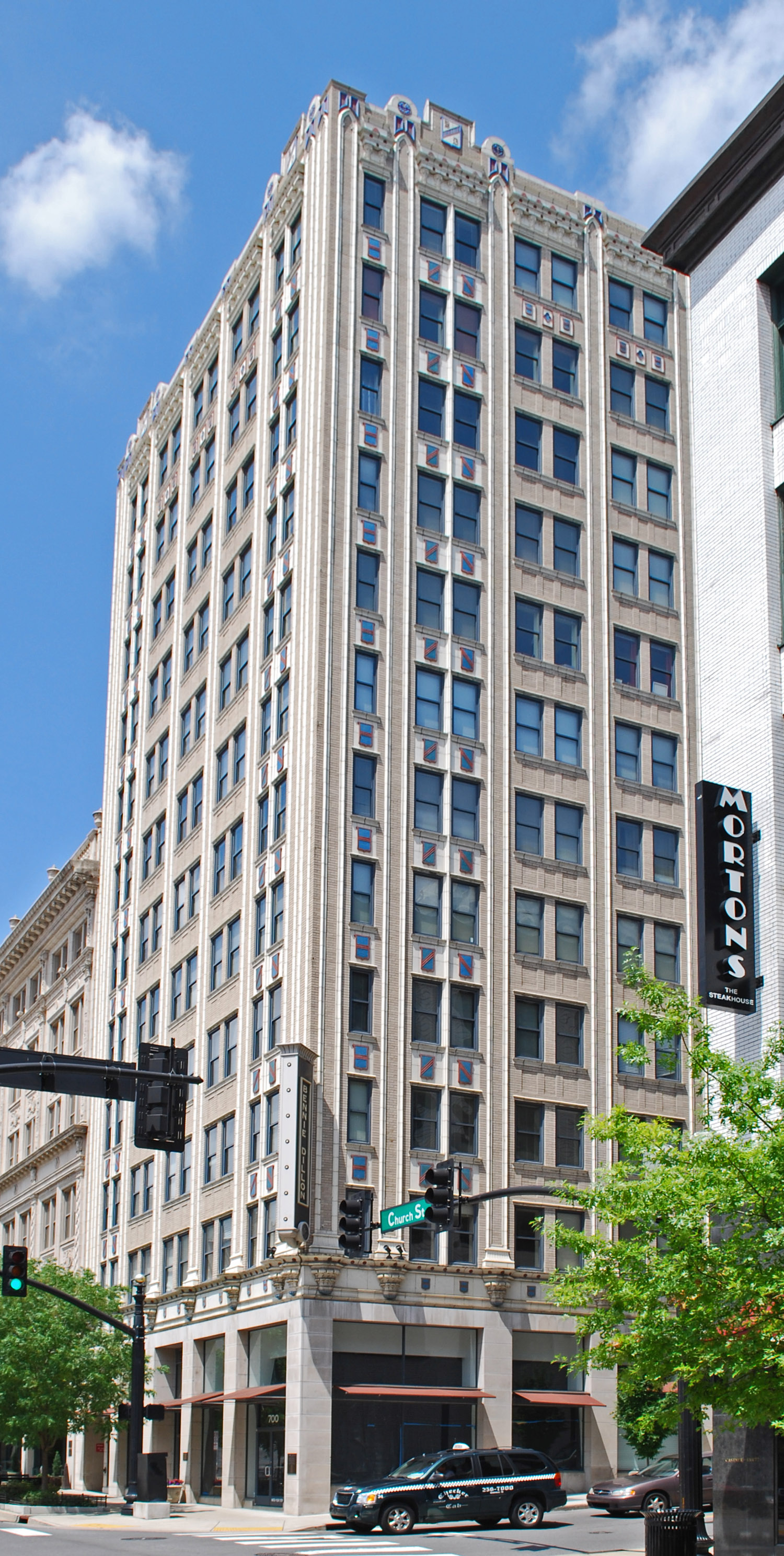

- Location within Tennessee Location within the United States
- Location: 700-704 Church Street, Nashville, Tennessee
- Coordinates: 36°9′44″N 86°46′59″W
- Area: 0.2 acres (0.081 ha)
- Built: 1925-26
- Built by: Foster & Creighton
- Architect: Asmus & Clark
- Architectural style: Renaissance Revival
- NRHP reference No.: 84003483
- Added to NRHP: August 16, 1984

The Bennie–Dillon Building is a historic high-rise building in Nashville, Tennessee.

== Location ==
It is located on the corner of Church Street and 7th Avenue North in Nashville, Tennessee. Its exact address is 700-704 Church Street.

== History ==
The high-rise building was built by the construction firm Foster & Creighton from 1925 to 1926 for George Bennie, a businessman who served as the President of the Nashville Chamber of Commerce, and William Dillon, a real estate developer. It was designed in the Renaissance Revival architectural style by the architectural team Asmus & Clark. It is 44.81 metre-high, with twelve stories.

It was renovated in 1999 and in 2005.

It has been added to the National Register of Historic Places listings in Davidson County, Tennessee since August 16, 1984.
