= Asmus & Clark =

Asmus and Clark was an architectural firm based in Nashville, Tennessee. Asmus and Norton was a predecessor firm.

It was a partnership of Christian A. Asmus and Richard R. Clark, formerly of Pittsburgh, Pennsylvania, formed in 1919, with offices at 634 Stahlman Building, in Nashville.

At least two of its works are listed on the National Register of Historic Places (NRHP) for their architecture.

Works of the firm and its predecessor include:

- Home for Aged Masons (1913), Ben Allen Ln. and R.S. Glass Blvd. Nashville, TN (Asmus and Norton), NRHP-listed
- Grand Lodge of Tennessee (1925), 100 7th Ave. N., Nashville (Asmus & Clark). Classical Revival-style.
- Bennie-Dillon Building (1925-26), 702 Church St., Nashville (Asmus & Clark), NRHP-listed Renaissance Revival.
- St. Thomas' Hospital, Nashville (Asmus & Clark)
