= Foster & Creighton =

American construction firm (1885–?)

- Formerly: Foster and Creighton Co., Foster and Creighton Company, Foster–Creighton Company
- Founded: 1885
- Founder: Wilbur Fisk Foster, Robert T. Creighton
- Headquarters: Nashville, Tennessee, U.S.

Foster & Creighton was a construction and civil engineering firm of Nashville, Tennessee. It has been known also as the Foster-Creighton Company, as the Foster and Creighton Co., and as Foster and Creighton Company.

It was founded in 1885 by Wilbur F. Foster (engineer) and Robert T. Creighton, who had both served as City Engineer of Nashville. The firm did a lot of contract work for government civil engineering projects. A third partner was bought out, early on, and the firm was known as Foster–Creighton Company.

A number of its works are listed on the National Register of Historic Places.

== List of work ==
List of works by Foster & Creighton
Year	Name	City	State	Notes
1888	Lebanon Road Stone Arch Bridge	Nashville	Tennessee	NRHP-listed
1896	Replica of the Parthenon at Centennial Park	Nashville	Tennessee	excavation, stone foundations and concrete slabs, superintendent / engineers W.F. Foster and R. T. Creighton
1913	Lock No. 3		Tennessee	started after 1893, for the Army Corps of Engineers
1922	Vanderbilt Stadium	Nashville	Tennessee	now FirstBank Stadium, for which the firm was project manager
1924	Shelbyville Hydroelectric Station	Shelbyville	Tennessee	NRHP-listed
1925	Bennie–Dillon Building	Nashville	Tennessee	NRHP-listed
1925	Columbia Hydroelectric Station	Columbia	Tennessee	located at Riverside Park, NRHP-listed
1927	Lillard's Mill Hydroelectric Station	Milltown	Tennessee	NRHP-listed
1928	Guildfor Dudley Sr. and Anne Dallas House	Forest Hills	Tennessee	NRHP-listed
1929	Parthenon Restoration at Centennial Park	Nashville	Tennessee	superintendent / engineers J.W. Wright, George Douglas Jr., Pete Tuberville
1929	Thomas Jefferson Hotel	Birmingham	Alabama	for which the firm was the contractor
1943	Building Construction AEDC Plant			superintendents / engineers Ben F. Fite, H. F. Campbell, A. C. Columbo, George Roden, Homer Crowder
1957	Electro-Manganese Plant, Foote Mineral Co.	Knoxville	Tennessee	superintendents / engineers George Rosen, William H. Price Jr., C. E. Barber.
1957	St. Mary's Hospital School of Nursing	Knoxville	Tennessee	superintendents / engineers George Roden, William H. Price Jr.
1960	Hospital	Oak Ridge	Tennessee	superintendents / engineers William H. Price Jr., George Rosen
1961	Cyclotron Facilities Buildings	Oak Ridge	Tennessee	superintendents / engineers George Roden, William H. Price Jr.
1964	Laboratory Building Atomic Energy Commission	Oak Ridge	Tennessee	superintendent William H. Price Jr.
1966	Saint Mary's Hospital Annunciation Wing	Knoxville	Tennessee	superintendent William H. Price Jr.
1967	Paris Road Bridge	New Orleans	Louisiana	also known as the Green Bridge
1971	Repairs to Parthenon at Centennial Park	Nashville	Tennessee	superintendent George Douglas Jr.
