= FirstBank Stadium =

Stadium located in Nashville, Tennessee, United States

Dudley Field at FirstBank Stadium
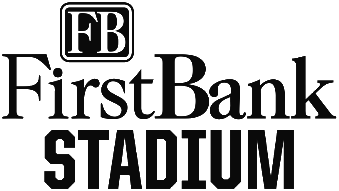

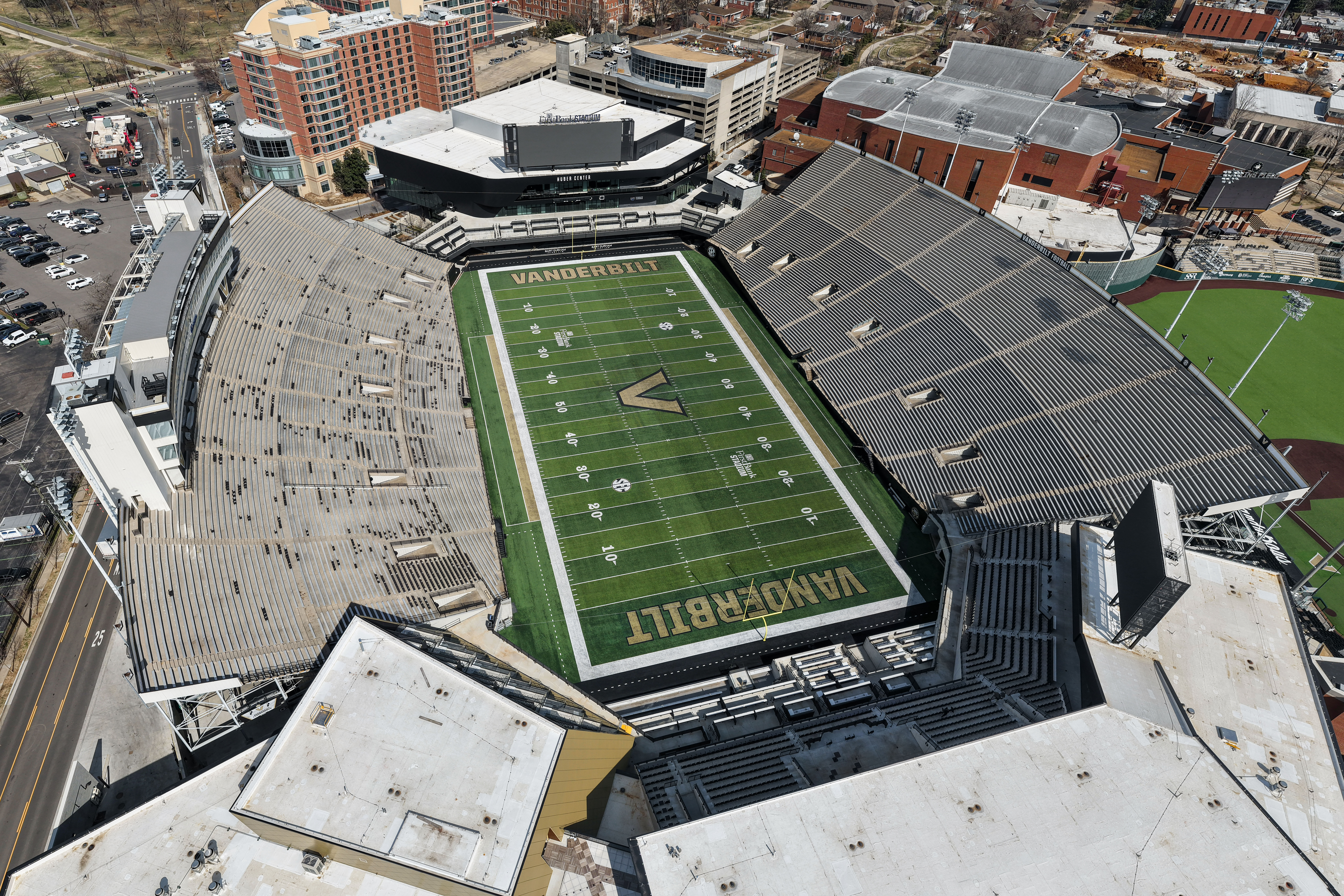
- Aerial view in 2026

- Location in the United States Location in Tennessee
- Interactive map of Dudley Field at FirstBank Stadium
- Former names: Dudley Field (1922–1981); Vanderbilt Stadium (1981–2022)
- Address: 2601 Jess Neely Drive
- Location: Vanderbilt University, Nashville, Tennessee, U.S.
- Coordinates: 36°8′39″N 86°48′32″W
- Elevation: 520 feet (160 m) AMSL
- Owner: Vanderbilt University
- Operator: Vanderbilt University
- Capacity: 35,000
- Surface: Grass (1922–1969, 1999–2011); AstroTurf (1970–1998); Artificial (Shaw Sports Legion 46; 2012–present)

Construction
- Groundbreaking: 1922
- Opened: October 14, 1922; 103 years ago (rebuilt 1981)
- Cost: $1.5 million ($28.9 million in 2025 dollars) $10.1 million (1981 reconstruction) ($35.8 million in 2025 dollars)
- Architects: Walk Jones and Francis Man, Inc. Michael Baker, Jr. Corp.
- General contractor: Foster & Creighton

Tenants
- Vanderbilt Commodores (NCAA) (1922–present); NCAA Division I Football Championship (NCAA) (2026–present); Tennessee Oilers (NFL) (1998); Music City Bowl (NCAA) (1998); Nashville FC (NPSL) (2014–2016); Tennessee State Tigers (NCAA) (1971, 1973–1994, 1996)

Website
- vucommodores.com/firstbank-stadium

FirstBank Stadium (formerly Dudley Field and Vanderbilt Stadium) is a college football stadium on the campus of Vanderbilt University in Nashville, Tennessee. Opened 104 years ago in 1922 as the first stadium in the South to be used exclusively for college football, it is the home of the Vanderbilt Commodores football team. When the venue was known as Vanderbilt Stadium, it hosted the Tennessee Oilers (now Titans) during the 1998 NFL season and the first Music City Bowl in 1998 and also hosted the Tennessee state high school football championships for many years.

FirstBank Stadium is the smallest stadium in the Southeastern Conference (SEC) and was the largest in Nashville until the completion of the Titans' Nissan Stadium in 1999. After the 2022–2025 renovation, its seating capacity was reduced to 35,000, down from the previous 40,350.

== History ==
=== Old Dudley Field ===
Vanderbilt football began in 1892, and for 30 years, Commodore football teams played on the northeast corner of campus where Wilson Hall, Kissam Quadrangle, and a portion of the Vanderbilt University Law School now stand, adjacent to today's 21st Avenue South.

The first facility was named for William Dudley, Dean of the Vanderbilt University Medical School from 1885 until his death in 1914. Dudley was responsible for the formation of the SIAA, the predecessor of the Southern Conference and Southeastern Conference, in 1895, and was also instrumental in the formation of the NCAA in 1906.

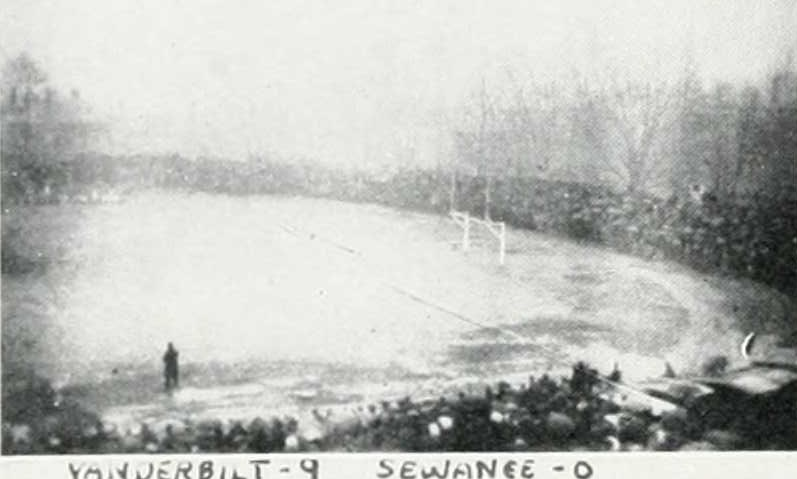
Old Dudley Field in 1921

In 1922, after a 74.2 winning percentage during the 18-year tenure of Coach McGugin, the Commodores had outgrown old Dudley Field. The old field was re-christened Curry Field, in honor of Irby "Rabbit" Curry, a standout football player from 1914 to 1916, who left Vanderbilt to serve in the American Expeditionary Force to Europe in World War I and was killed while flying a combat mission over France in 1918. The football team played two games on the renamed Curry Field before moving to New Dudley Field in 1922.

=== New Dudley Field ===
There was not enough room to expand old Dudley Field at its site near Kirkland Hall, so Vanderbilt administrators purchased land adjacent to what is today 25th Avenue South, on the west side of campus, for the new facility. The new stadium, the first in the South built solely for football, was christened "Dudley Field", and its capacity was 20,000. As evidence of Vanderbilt's stature in the sport at the time, it dwarfed rival Tennessee's Shields-Watkins Field (now Neyland Stadium), which had opened a year earlier and seated only 3,200.

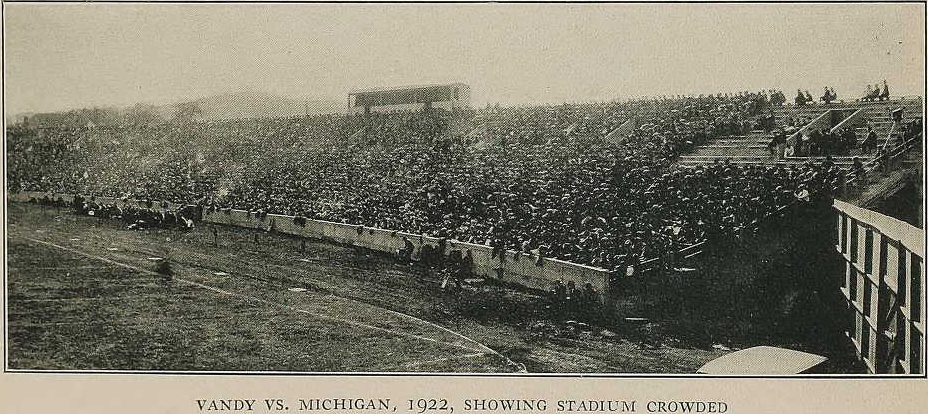
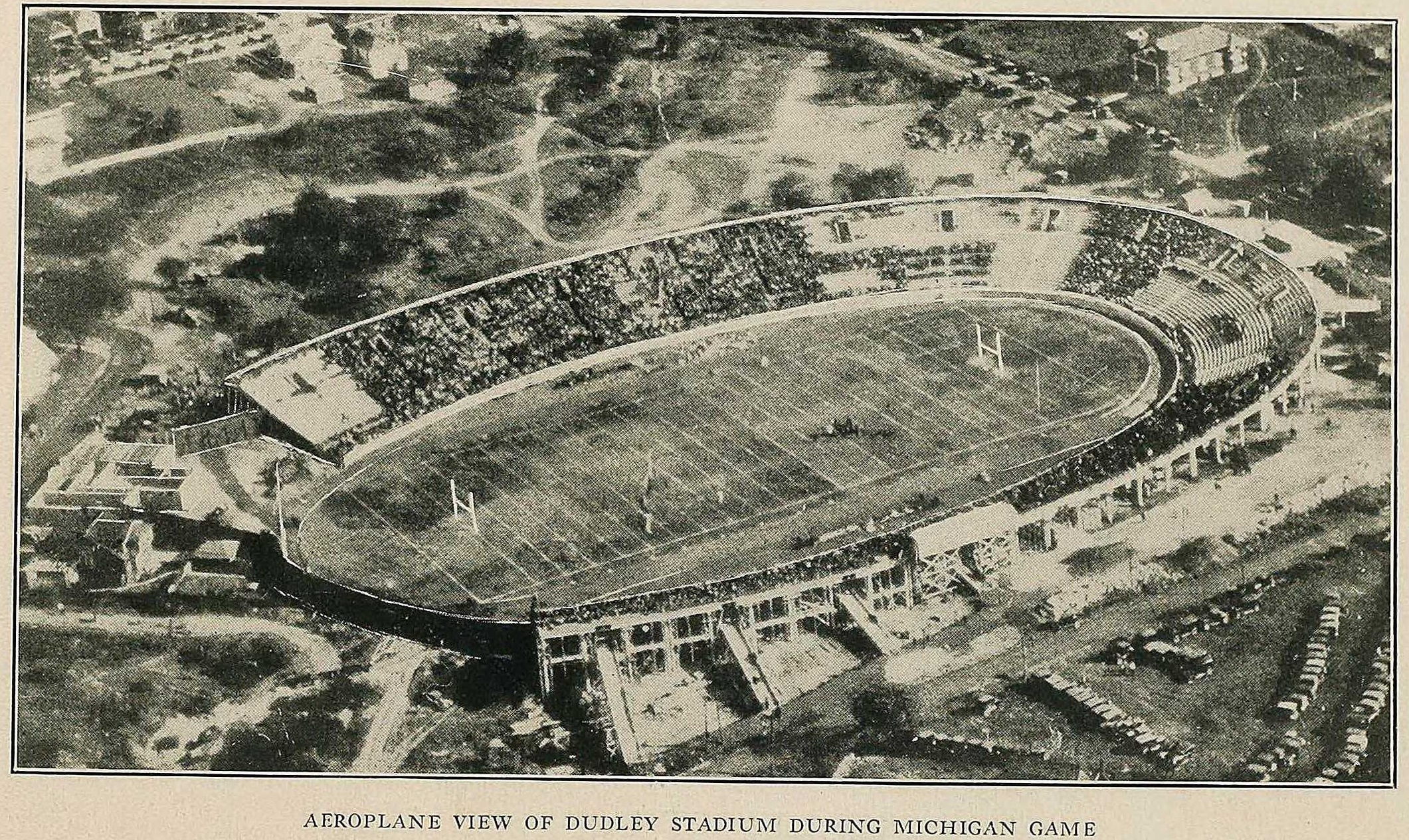
New Dudley Field on October 14, 1922 during its first game

The first game played at new Dudley Field was on October 14, 1922 between the Commodores and the powerful Michigan Wolverines. A goal line stand by the Commodores preserved a 0–0 tie. The following Friday, nearby Hume-Fogg High School played a game at the stadium. Senior Jimmy Armistead returned the opening kickoff for a touchdown, the first touchdown ever recorded at the stadium. Armistead went on to a successful career at Vanderbilt. He was the captain and starting quarterback for the 1928 team.

In 1949, Vanderbilt officials built a modern press box at Dudley Field, replacing a platform that had been used prior to that. Additional seating was also added to the west side of stadium, boosting capacity to 27,901.

On September 25, 1954, Vanderbilt hosted the No. 10-ranked Baylor Bears in the first night game ever played on the Dudley Field surface. Lights were installed so that Dudley Field could host a Billy Graham Crusade on campus.

In 1960, nearly 7,000 more seats were added to the stadium, with an expansion on the east side of the stadium near Memorial Gym. Capacity jumped to 34,000.

At a price of $250,000 (equal to $2,072,622 today), officials installed what was then a state-of-the-art AstroTurf synthetic surface in 1970.

=== Vanderbilt Stadium ===
==== Battleship gray ====
Over the winter and spring of 1980–81, most of the Dudley Field grandstand was demolished. The 12,088 seats on each sideline—the only vestige of the old stadium—were raised ten feet through the use of 22 hydraulic jacks on each side of the stadium. The "new" venue was rechristened Vanderbilt Stadium. However, the playing surface itself is still called Dudley Field.

The rebuilt stadium and its Fred Russell Press Box (named for Vanderbilt alumnus, former football player, and sports journalist Fred Russell) were designed to resemble a United States naval vessel slicing through the water—a nod to Vanderbilt's naval themed-mascot, the Commodore. Accordingly, the color scheme picked for the exterior of the stadium was battleship gray.

The stadium's maximum capacity after the 1980–81 renovation was 41,000, consisting of a single-decked horseshoe grandstand filled in with wooden bleachers from the 1960 expansion. The project cost $10.1 million, and the Commodores celebrated a sold-out dedication by taking a 23–17 comeback win over Maryland on September 12, 1981.

To enhance the gameday experience, officials increased capacity to 41,448 and added a Jumbotron video screen in the north end zone, adjacent to Kensington Place, in advance of the Tennessee Oilers playing their 1998 home games in the facility.

After the Oilers—now the Titans—left in 1999, the playing surface was returned to grass. In 2002 and 2003, the school removed the aging bleachers from the 1960 renovation from the north end zone, lowering capacity to 41,221 in 2002 and to 39,773 in 2003. The bleachers from the north end zone were replaced with a visitors' concourse that affords any fan in the stadium a field-level, up-close experience with the playing surface. The metal frames for the bleachers were relocated to Mt. Juliet Christian School's football facility in suburban Nashville.

==== Brick-and-iron ====
After nearby Hawkins Field, Vanderbilt's baseball stadium, was constructed in a classic brick-and-iron style in 2002, Vanderbilt administrators began to look at giving Vanderbilt Stadium a similar flavor. They also began to consider the construction of a football facility in place of the present concourse and JumboTron in the north end zone.

On July 24, 2007, Vanderbilt officials announced they were in the preliminary stages of a stadium renovation plan, with financing, design concept, and date of completion yet to be determined.

Nine months later, on May 20, 2008, Vice Chancellor David Williams II announced, in a McGugin Center press conference, that the university was beginning a five-phased, multimillion-dollar program of renovations to Vanderbilt athletics facilities, including extensive renovations and additions to Vanderbilt Stadium.

Under the plan announced by Williams, Vanderbilt Stadium was modified (in the first four phases) as follows:

| Phase | Date completed | Estimated cost | Renovation and construction |
|---|---|---|---|
| I | August 2008 | $12 million | Brick-and-iron fences, new ticketing facility, renovation of east concourse, new paint scheme throughout interior, exterior of stadium painted gold, "VANDERBILT" and Star-V logos added to exterior of press box |
| II | August 2009 | $12 million | Renovation of west concourse, brick-and-iron fences added to west concourse, addition of brick to exterior of Natchez Trace (west) façade of stadium, construction of new entry plazas at Gates 2 and 3 on Jess Neely Drive |
| III | August 2010 | $8 million | Renovation of north concourse, brick-and-iron fences added to north concourse, completion of bricking of exterior of entire stadium, construction of new entry plazas at Gates 1 and 4 on Kensington Avenue |
| IV | August 2011 | $18 million | Construction of additional seating, football offices, locker rooms, recruiting facilities, hospitality facilities, and indoor/outdoor luxury suites in north endzone, with relocation of JumboTron, addition of high-quality synthetic playing surface on Dudley Field |
Source: Vanderbilt Athletics Facility Upgrade Central

On February 6, 2012, Williams announced Vanderbilt would be adding new FieldTurf and a new JumboTron. A large berm was constructed in the open end of FirstBank Stadium as a place for fans to watch games starting fall 2012. The project, in addition to other renovations, began after the Black & Gold scrimmage on April 14, 2012.

With only 500 seats available, the hillside was a first-come, first-served area in terms of picking a spot to sit. The berm did not reach the permanent seating on the sidelines to leave space in the corners of the end zone for fans to enter.

The fourth major project set for the stadium was improved lighting. Renovations were also completed at McGugin Center, with new meeting rooms and Olympic sport locker rooms built. The work was completed in the summer of 2014.

Since the 2007 season, midshipmen of the Vanderbilt Naval ROTC sound a foghorn, nicknamed "The Admiral", whenever the Commodores take the field, as well as after every score and win. It is also sounded at intervals prior to the scheduled kickoff to encourage fans to go ahead and enter the stadium. After wins the Commodores raise a victory flag sporting the "Star V" emblem.

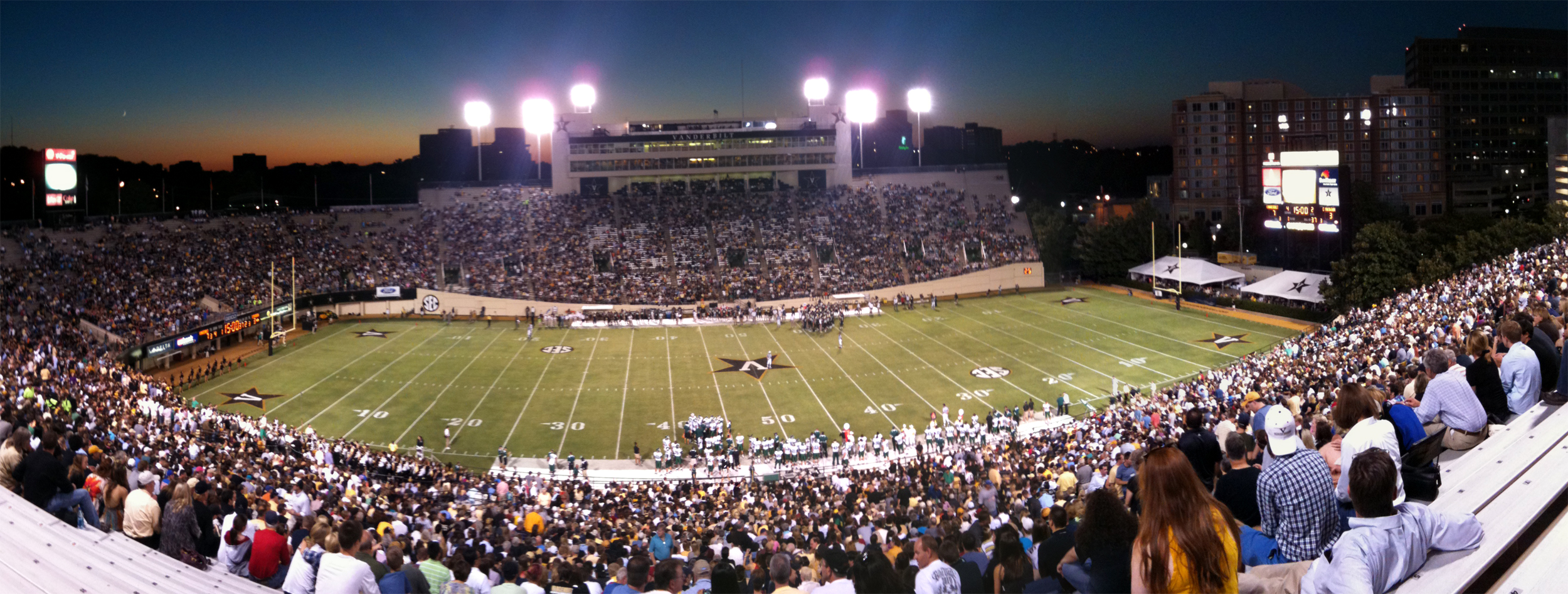
Stadium panoramic during a Vanderbilt football game in the 2010 season.

=== Naming rights ===
On August 29, 2022, Vanderbilt announced a ten-year naming rights deal with Nashville-based FirstBank for the football team's stadium.

=== Historic upset win against Alabama ===
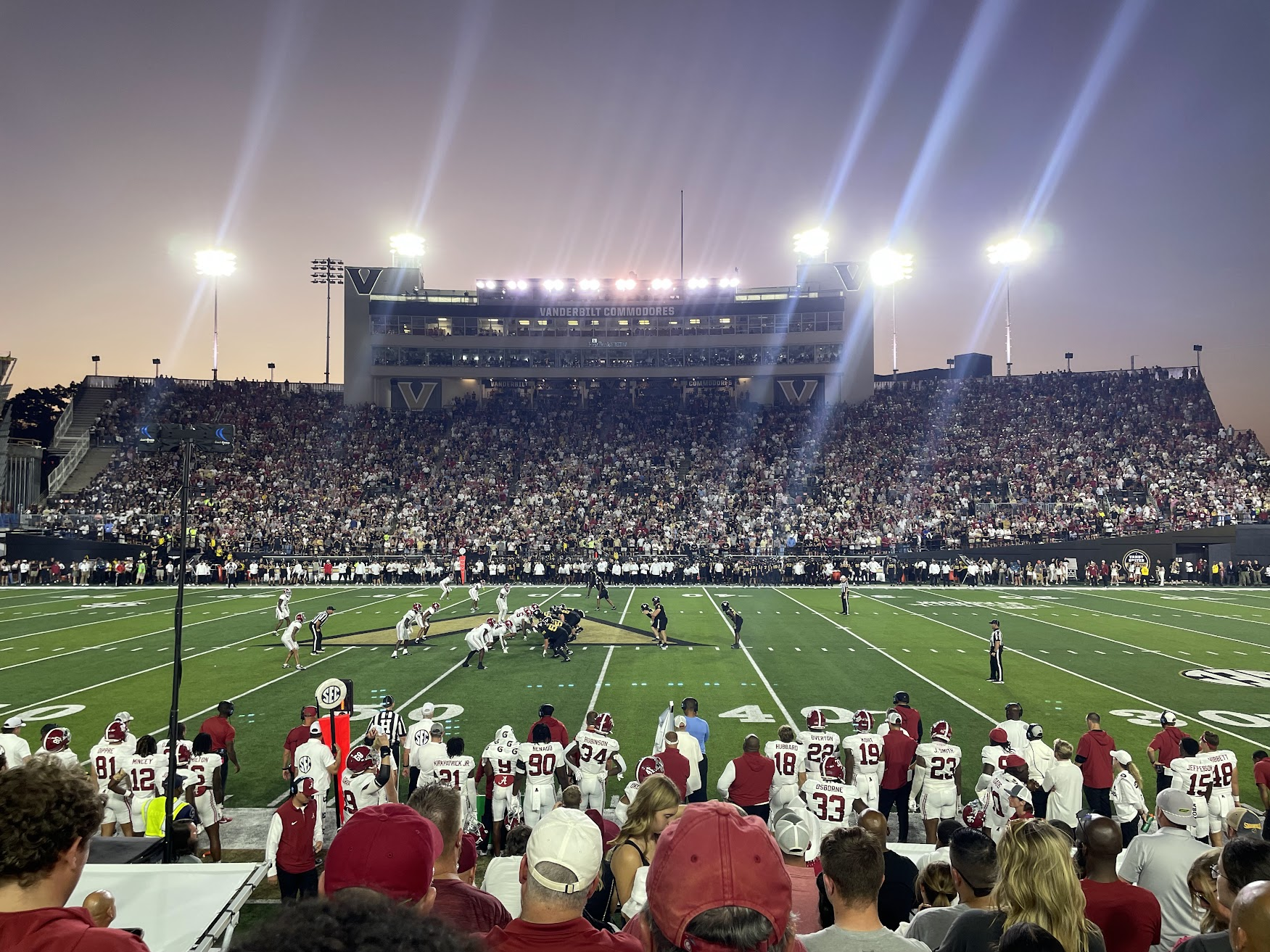
FirstBank Stadium in 2024 during the historic upset win against Alabama

On October 5, 2024, FirstBank Stadium hosted unranked Vanderbilt’s stunning 40–35 upset over the top-ranked University of Alabama Crimson Tide. It was Vanderbilt’s first victory over the college football powerhouse since 1984 and its first win in Nashville since 1969. Additionally, it marked Vanderbilt’s first-ever victory against a Top 5 opponent.

Vanderbilt students in celebration tore down the south end zone goalpost, and carried it approximately 2.5 miles through downtown Nashville before throwing it into the Cumberland River.

== Other NCAA use ==
Tennessee State utilized FirstBank Stadium as a prominent venue for major games, hosting at least one game annually in 1971, from 1973 to 1994, and again in 1996. On September 15, 2018, while Vanderbilt was away playing Notre Dame, the Virginia Cavaliers played the Ohio Bobcats in FirstBank Stadium. The game was relocated from Charlottesville, Virginia due to the threat of Hurricane Florence.

For at least 2026 and 2027, the NCAA Division I Football Championship game (FCS) is scheduled to be played at FirstBank Stadium due to renovations at Toyota Stadium in Frisco, Texas.

The 2026 John A. Merritt Classic between Tennessee State and Jackson State was moved to FirstBank Stadium since Nissan Stadium was being used for a Titans preseason game.

== NFL use ==
Upon moving to Nashville, the Oilers/Titans franchise initially played at the larger Liberty Bowl Memorial Stadium in Memphis while Nissan Stadium (then called Adelphia Coliseum) was under construction in Nashville. Initially, the Oilers were unwilling to play at Vanderbilt Stadium while Nissan Stadium was being built. Not only was it thought to be too small even for temporary use, but university officials were unwilling to allow the sale of alcohol.

However, dismal attendance during the 1997 season, due in part to both the unwillingness of many Nashville fans to make the trip to Memphis and Memphis fans' indifference to a temporary team after years of failing to secure their own NFL franchise, led the Oilers to play their last season under that name in Nashville at Vanderbilt Stadium, although the university forbade the franchise from selling alcohol at home games.

Vanderbilt Stadium thus became the smallest home venue in the NFL since several similar-size stadiums were used in 1970. (The merger agreement with the American Football League led the NFL to declare stadiums seating fewer than 50,000, such as Fenway Park, to be inadequate for league play and after the 1970 NFL season none were used for NFL games on a long-term basis.) The Los Angeles Chargers used a smaller venue, the 27,000-seat Dignity Health Sports Park in Carson, California, as their home for the 2017, 2018 and 2019 NFL seasons while SoFi Stadium was being built for the Chargers and the Los Angeles Rams, who were playing in the far larger Los Angeles Memorial Coliseum in South Los Angeles.

== Non-sporting events ==
Over its history, Vanderbilt Stadium has occasionally been used for concerts and major speakers.

=== Concerts ===
| Date | Artist | Opening act(s) | Tour / Concert name | Attendance | Revenue | Notes |
|---|---|---|---|---|---|---|
| May 8, 1994 | Pink Floyd | — | The Division Bell Tour | 41,169 / 41,169 | $1,348,505 | |
| October 26, 1997 | The Rolling Stones | Sheryl Crow | Bridges to Babylon Tour | 45,193 / 45,193 | $2,551,578 | |
| April 25, 2009 | Dave Matthews Band | Robert Earl Keen; Jason Mraz | — | — | — | |
| July 2, 2011 | U2 | Florence and the Machine | U2 360° Tour | 46,857 / 46,857 | $4,269,125 | |
| July 11, 2015 | Luke Bryan | Florida Georgia Line; Randy Houser; Thomas Rhett; Dustin Lynch; DJ Rock | Kick the Dust Up Tour | 31,907 / 31,907 | $2,705,682 | |
| August 23, 2018 | Beyoncé; Jay-Z | Chloe X Halle; DJ Khaled | On the Run II Tour | 35,353 / 35,353 | $4,058,910 | |
| August 3, 2027 | Slipknot | Bring Me The Horizon; Kublai Khan TX | (sic)est Stadium Tour | / | | |

=== Major speakers ===
- Billy Graham – September 19, 1954 and June 24–27, 1979
- John F. Kennedy – May 18, 1963

== See also ==
- List of NCAA Division I FBS football stadiums
- List of American football stadiums by capacity
- Lists of stadiums

| Preceded by Liberty Bowl Memorial Stadium | Home of the Tennessee Oilers; 1998 | Succeeded by Adelphia Coliseum |
