= Home for Aged Masons =

- U.S. National Register of Historic Places
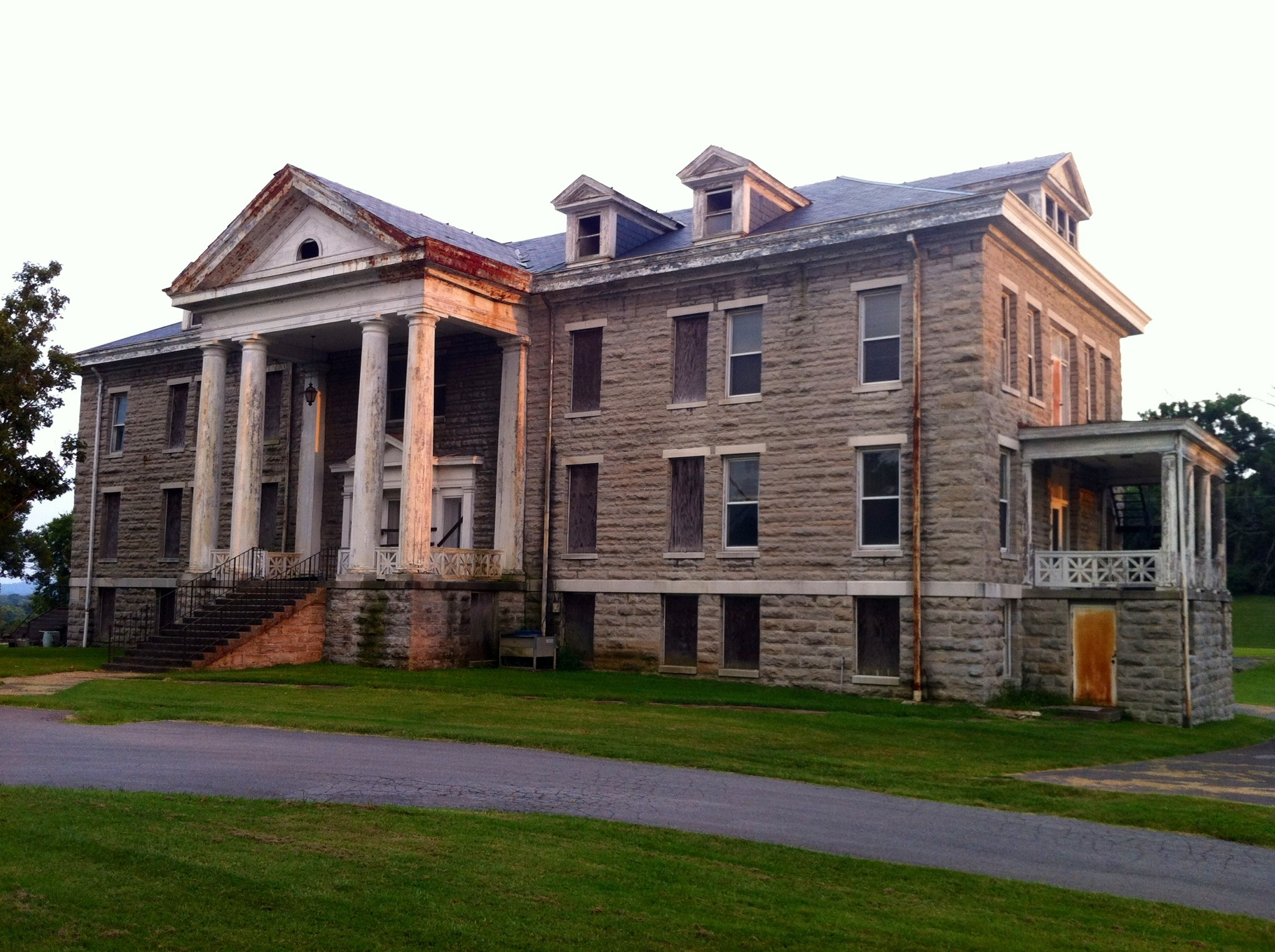
- The building in 2013

- Location within Tennessee Location within the United States
- Location: Ben Allen Lane and R.S. Glass Boulevard, Nashville, Tennessee
- Coordinates: 36°13′03″N 86°44′36″W
- Area: 2 acres (0.81 ha)
- Built: 1913
- Architect: Asmus and Norton
- Architectural style: Colonial Revival
- NRHP reference No.: 08001086
- Added to NRHP: November 19, 2008

The Home for Aged Masons, formerly known as the Masonic Widows' and Orphans' Home and the Middle Tennessee Tuberculosis Hospital, is a historic building in Nashville, Tennessee, USA.

== History ==
The land was given to the Grand Lodge of Tennessee Free and Accepted Masons by Jere Baxter, the founder of the Tennessee Central Railroad. The building was designed by Nashville architects Asmus and Norton in Colonial Revival style, and was completed in 1913–1915. It housed older Freemasons and families of lower means. It was co-founded by William H. Bumpas and Marcus B. Toney, who served as its founding president. Toney was a Confederate veteran, Klansman, and Edward Bushrod Stahlman's brother-in-law. Stahlman was one of the charter members.

Masonic Home for the Aged in 1940

The building was acquired by the state of Tennessee and repurposed as the Middle Tennessee Tuberculosis Hospital in 1941. It was used as offices for the Tennessee Department of Health in the 1970s and 1980s.

The property was unoccupied from 1999 to 2009, when the state of Tennessee suggested demolishing it to save money. However, by 2016 state officials were "attempting" to preserve it.

It has been listed on the National Register of Historic Places since November 19, 2008.
