= Marcus B. Toney =

Confederate soldier and Klansman

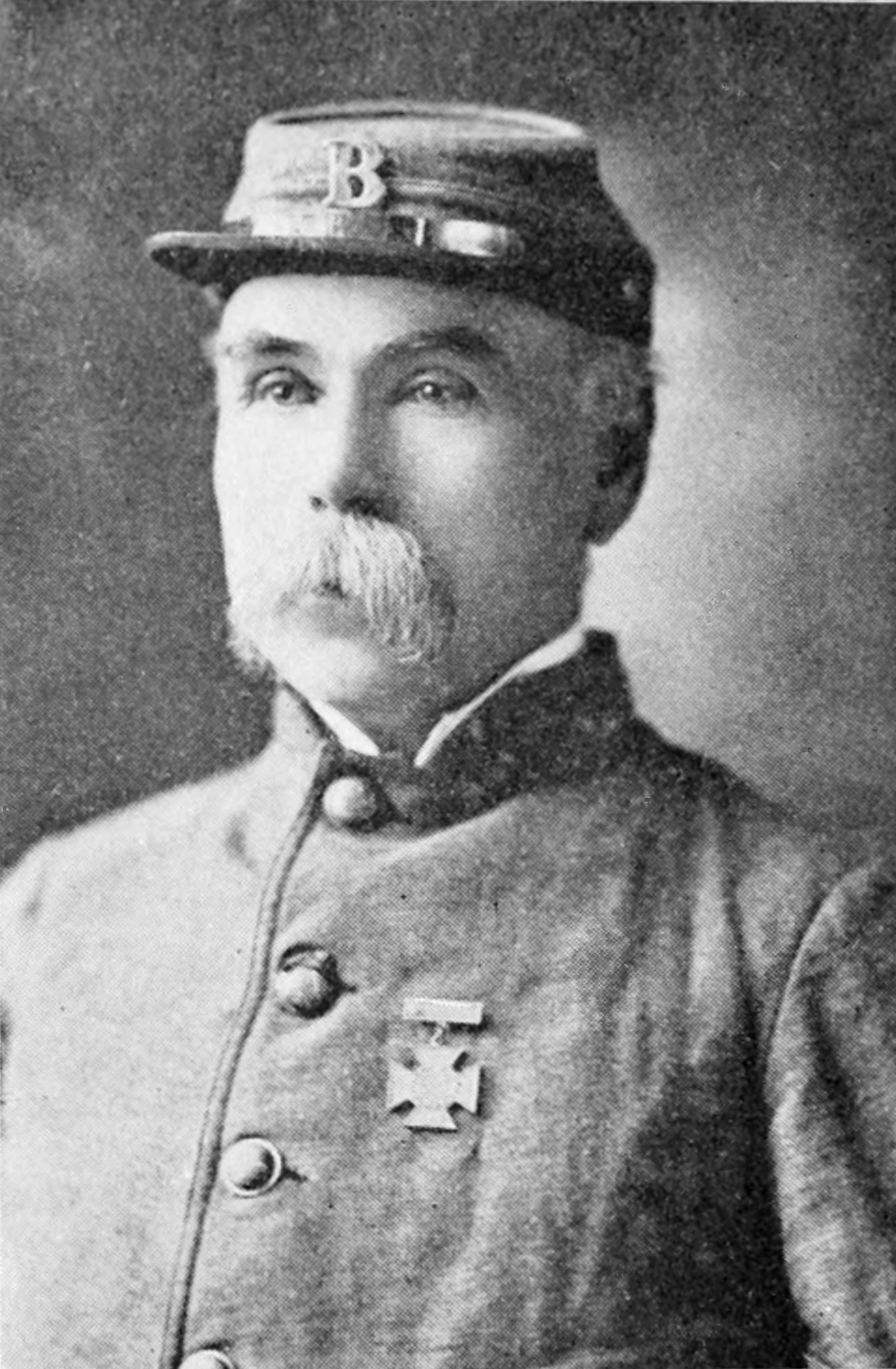
- Born: c. 1840; Buckingham County, Virginia, U.S.
- Died: November 1, 1929; Nashville, Tennessee, U.S.
- Resting place: Mount Olivet Cemetery
- Occupation: Railroad employee
- Known for: Confederate veteran, Masonic leader, memoirist
- Spouse: Sallie Claiborne
- Children: 2 daughters
- Relatives: Edward Bushrod Stahlman (brother-in-law)

Marcus B. Toney (c. 1840 - November 1, 1929) was an American Confederate veteran, Klansman and Masonic leader who worked for the Tennessee Central Railroad. He was the author of The Privations of a Private, a memoir about his service in the Confederate States Army. He was the founding president of the Home for Aged Masons.

== Early life ==
Toney was born circa 1840 in Buckingham County, Virginia. His father, a millwright, had planned to settle in St. Louis, but Mrs. Toney became ill and couldn't travel beyond Nashville. She never fully recovered and died when Marcus was six. None of Toney's siblings survived childhood, and when his father died early in 1852, the eleven-year-old was left alone in the world. Relatives brought him back to Virginia, where he attended college, but by 1860, he had returned to Nashville.

== Career ==
During the American Civil War of 1861–1865, Toney served in the Confederate States Army, under generals Robert E. Lee and Stonewall Jackson. He was captured and sent to Elmira Prison. After the war, Toney joined the Ku Klux Klan, under the leadership of Nathan Bedford Forrest.

Toney authored a memoir about his Civil War and reconstruction era experience, The Privations of a Private, in 1905. In a review for the Tennessee Historical Quarterly, Gary D. Joiner of Louisiana State University Shreveport acknowledged that the book sounded "offensive" to modern-day readers, but he suggested that Toney "was in the norm for his time and place." Joiner added that Toney was a "white supremacist", and that the book promoted the Lost Cause ideology.

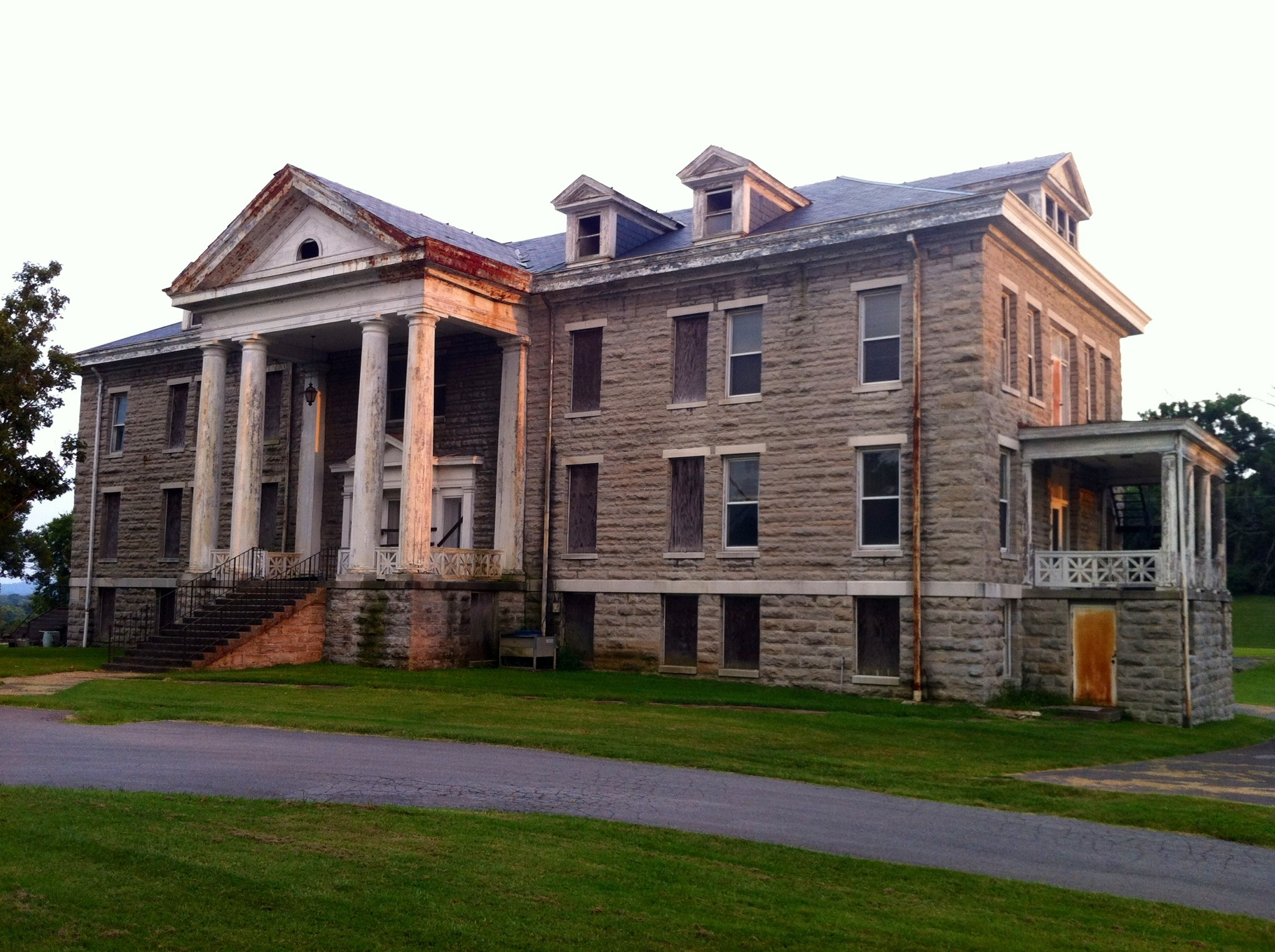
The Home for Aged Masons in Nashville.

Toney began his career at the Southern Express Company. He worked for the Tennessee Central Railroad for five decades, and retired in 1917.

Toney was a Masonic leader. He was "one of the oldest members of the Cumberland Lodge of Masons", and the founding president of the Home for Aged Masons in Nashville.

== Personal life, death and legacy ==
Toney married Sallie Claiborne in 1871; she died in 1874. They had two daughters. His brother-in-law, Edward Bushrod Stahlman, was the publisher of the Nashville Banner. He resided at 1805 20th Avenue South in Nashville, Tennessee.

Toney died on November 1, 1929, in Nashville, Tennessee, at the age of 89. He was buried in Mount Olivet Cemetery.

The University of Alabama Press was awarded the General Basil W. Duke Award from the Military Order of the Stars and Bars for its re-publication of Toney's memoir in 2006.
