= Thomas Jefferson Hotel =

19-story building on the western side of downtown Birmingham, Alabama

Coordinates: 33.51280°N 86.81069°W

Thomas Jefferson Tower
- Thomas Jefferson Hotel
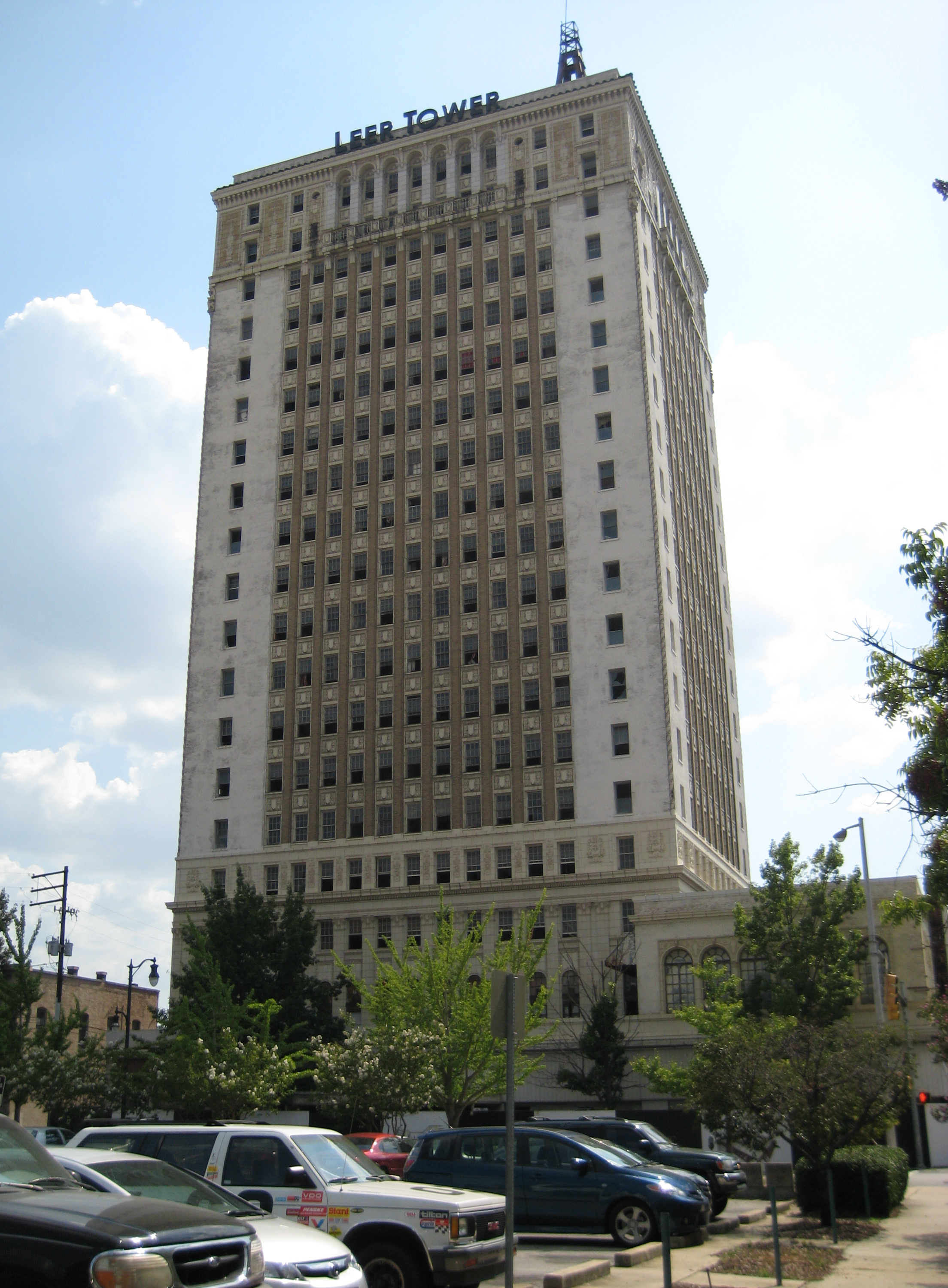
- Thomas Jefferson Hotel in 2008, with the now-gone signage for the defunct "Leer Tower" plan, and the stump of the Zeppelin mooring mast visible on the roof.
- Former names: Hotel Thomas Jefferson, Cabana Hotel

General information
- Architectural style: Spanish revival
- Location: 1623 2nd Avenue North, Birmingham, Alabama, USA
- Current tenants: N/A
- Construction started: May 1926
- Opening: September 7, 1929
- Cost: $2.5 million
- Client: Union Realty Company
- Owner: Burt Ordorff

Height
- Height: 87.48 m (287.0 ft)

Technical details
- Structural system: steel
- Floor count: 19

Design and construction
- Architect: David Oliver Whilldin
- Architecture firm: N/A
- Main contractor: The Foster-Creighton Company

Other information
- Number of rooms: 350

Thomas Jefferson Tower, originally the Thomas Jefferson Hotel and then the Cabana Hotel, is a 19-story high rise apartment building on the western side of downtown Birmingham, Alabama. It was completed in 1929 as the 350-room Thomas Jefferson Hotel and is at 1623 2nd Avenue North. It has a tower in its roof intended to be a zeppelin mooring mast.

== History ==
The Thomas Jefferson Hotel was planned and developed by the Union Realty Company, headed by Henry Cobb. The company was organized in November 1925 in the office of architect David O. Whilldin, who prepared the design for the $1.5 million project. The Foster-Creighton Company of Nashville, Tennessee was selected as contractor and work began on the site in May 1926. Progress was halted in April 1927 when one of the projects financiers, the Adair Realty and Trust Company of Atlanta, Georgia failed. A new holding company was formed and work resumed in July 1928. Costs reached $2.5 million before it opened on September 7, 1929. The hotel's opening week featured nightly banquets and dances featuring an orchestra from New York. It was originally called The Thomas Jefferson Hotel, then the Cabana Hotel, the Leer Tower, and finally the Thomas Jefferson Tower.

=== Design ===
The hotel featured an ornate marble lobby, a large ballroom, and a rooftop mooring mast intended for use by dirigibles. The ground floor incorporated space for six shops and the basement included a billiard room and barber shop. The ballroom and dining rooms on the second floor opened out onto roof terraces from which the main tower rose. A Corinthian colonnade in glazed white terra-cotta set off the base of the tower, with the hotel entrance marked by a metal canopy. The fourth floor created an entablature, punctuated by the rhythm of windows that continued in brick for 13 more floors. The tower was capped on the top two floors with ornamented terra-cotta, including a balustrade and arched deep-set openings. The corners of the tower were clad in white brick to provide visual supports for the upper portion of the tower, while the narrow strips of brick between the windows were tan in color, each capped with a white acanthus leaf at the top. The edge of each corner was softened with a twisted-rope moulding, rising to a sculpted satyr at the top. The cornice rests on tightly spaced brackets with a shallow overhang of red mission tile suggesting a sloped roof.

=== Early years ===
A $35,000 improvement project was undertaken in 1933. Some of the retail spaces were subsumed into a larger hotel lobby with an electric fireplace. The dining room was similarly expanded and a banquet room was constructed over part of the roof terrace. It was only the first of several renovations for numerous owners. The Stirrup Cup lounge opened at the hotel on October 4, 1940. Birmingham newspapers declared the 200-room Thomas Jefferson Hotel as one of the finest in the country. Built to host huge gatherings, the $2.5 million facility was stocked with 7,000 pieces of silverware, 5,000 glasses and 4,000 sets of linen. As an affiliate of the National Hotels chain and under the management of Austin Frame, the Thomas Jefferson advertised rooms from $9 to 18 a night and multi-room suites for $18 to 35. All rooms were air conditioned and provided with a private bath, radio, television and Muzak. The hotel operated a laundry and valet service and housed a coffee shop, lounge, pharmacy and barber shop. Nightly dinner dances were held in the Windsor Room. Other rooms available for events included the Terrace Ballroom, Jefferson Room, Green Room, Gold Room, Board Room and Director's Room.

"Southern charm and hospitality at its happy best, wonderful best. That's the pride of Birmingham The Hotel Thomas Jefferson", an early newspaper ad boasted.

A large vertically oriented painted sign for the Thomas Jefferson Hotel is still visible on the brick-clad west side of the tower. At one time the letters were outlined with neon tubes, fabricated and installed by Dixie Neon. "It had an excellent chef. Among the bellboys, they were especially known for pecan pies", a man who was a bellboy in 1943 says with a smile, as if just being offered a piece. "Oh man, they were delicious."

Its luxury status made the Thomas Jefferson a prime spot for celebrities visiting the city, including Mickey Rooney and Ethel Merman. U.S Presidents Calvin Coolidge and Herbert Hoover and singer Ray Charles have also stayed at the hotel. But most of the guests were businessmen, often salesmen who rented one room for sleeping and another as an office for peddling their inventory.

The hotel was a showplace with unparalleled amenities. And when the employees were not carrying luggage and serving guests, they operated a popular side business at the hotel. In the age of Prohibition, clever methods were used to meet the needs of thirsty guests. Bellboys would buy "Pensacola rye" from the nearby police station to sell to hotel guests.

=== Cabana Hotel ===
The 1970s marked a period of decline for the aging luxury hotel, renamed the Cabana Hotel in 1972. A new rooftop sign advertising the hotel was then added, along with a main hotel sign. The original ornate carpets were now replaced with shag carpets, and dropped ceilings were added. The economy had slowed, and a shift of attention to the northern end of town left older hotels, such as the Cabana, struggling. The scene was typical nationwide, as corporate mergers and new projects prompted the closing of many old buildings.

During its peak, the Cabana hosted Mickey Rooney and Ethel Merman during visits to Birmingham. A special suite was reserved for Bear Bryant during games at Legion Field. In Birmingham, the Cabana was the last of the perennial hotels to fade away following the demise of the original Tutwiler Hotel in 1974, and the Bankhead Hotel conversion into senior housing. Its demise was also quickened by the opening of the BJCC complex to the north, taking all of its business to the Hyatt House Birmingham Hotel (now Sheraton Birmingham) and the Holiday Inn Civic Center (now gone) as well. It was a slow death that stripped it of most of its former glory. The hotel had suffered two major fires during this period of decline: one large one in 1980 and a smaller one in 1981. By 1981, the Cabana was a second-rate, $200-a-month apartment building with fewer than 100 residents. The hotel was shut down on May 31, 1983, by city health officials after it was declared uninhabitable on account of "bad plumbing, insufficient lighting, some inoperative smoke detectors and failure to upgrade to city fire codes".

=== Leer Tower ===
In 2005 the Leer Corporation of Modesto, California, announced a $20 million proposal to convert the building into upscale condominiums, to be known as the Leer Tower. That proposal was delayed by a dispute over control of the building and the owner's inability to secure local financing. The property went into foreclosure in July 2008. Subsequently the property had fallen further into disrepair, with the basement flooded with water and vagrants squatting in the upper floors.

=== Non-Profit seeks to renovate ===
In 2012, it was reported that a nonprofit corporation, Thomas Jefferson Tower Inc., was raising funds to buy the building and renovate it into a hotel, possibly as part of a mixed-use development including retail, a grocery store, and apartments. These efforts would ultimately prove unsuccessful.

=== Thomas Jefferson Tower ===
In August 2013, the building and its annex were acquired by TJTower LLC, a group of investors from Little Rock, Arkansas and New Orleans including former professional basketball player Brian Beshara. The former hotel was one of the first projects in Alabama to utilize new state and federal tax credits designed to spur redevelopment of historic structures.

Pre-construction plans called for mixed-use conversion into 100 apartments, ground floor restaurant and retail space, and event/entertainment space in the former dining room and ballroom.

It is one of multiple revitalization projects occurring in downtown Birmingham, along with the renovation of the long-closed Lyric Theater and the nearby Pizitz Building.

Construction began on February 12, 2015. As of May 2015, the "Leer Tower" signage as well as the ground floor siding had been removed.

On August 6, 2016, the top portion of the rooftop mooring mast was replaced, and the structure returned to its original appearance. The structure features LED lighting that can be remotely changed in color and intensity to mark specific occasions, much like is done at the Empire State Building in New York. It reopened in 2017. It became one of America's Prime attractions from Alabama.
