= List of Tennessee Freemasons =

This is a list of notable Tennessee Freemasons. It includes Freemasons who were at some point members under the jurisdiction the Grand Lodge of Tennessee.

== Politicians ==
- Joseph Anderson - U.S. Senator (1799-1815); first Comptroller of U.S. Treasury.
- John Bell - U.S. Senator (1847-1859); U.S. Secretary of War; Speaker of the U.S. House of Representatives. Member of King Solomon Lodge #6.
- George W. Campbell - U.S. Minister to Russia; U.S. Senator (1811-1819); Secretary of the Treasury. Member of Tennessee Lodge #2.
- Edward W. Carmack - U.S. Senator (1901-1907); U.S. Representative (1897-1901). Member of Memphis Lodge #118.
- Henry Cooper - U.S. Senator (1871-1877); Tennessee Representative. Member of Shelbyville Lodge #122.*
- Jenkin Whiteside - U.S. Senator (1809-1813). Member of Greeneville Lodge #3.
- Ephraim H. Foster - U.S. Senator (1838-1839, 1843–1845); Tennessee Representative. Member of Nashville Lodge #37.
- Albert Gore Sr. - U.S. Senator (1953-1971); U.S. Representative (1939-1953). Member of Carthage Benevolent Lodge #14.
- Felix Grundy - U.S. Attorney General (1838-1839); U.S. Senator (1839-1840); U.S. Representative; Chief Justice of the Kentucky Court of Appeals. Member of Hiram Lodge #7.
- Estes Kefauver - U.S. Senator (1949-1963); U.S. Representative (1939-1949). Member of Chattanooga Lodge #199.
- Kenneth McKellar - U.S. Senator (1917-1953), U.S. Representative (1911-1917). Member of Leila Scott Lodge #289.
- Alfred O. P. Nicholson - U.S. Senator (1840-1842); Tennessee Senator; Tennessee Representative. Member of Columbia Lodge #31.
- James D. Richardson - U.S. Representative (1885-1905); House Minority Leader (1899-1903). Initiated in Mt. Moriah Lodge #18; Holy Royal Arch Degrees Pythagoras Chapter #23; Grand High Priest (Holy Royal Arch) in 1873; Grand Master of Tennessee in 1883; Grand Commander of the Supreme Council of Scottish Rite Southern Jurisdiction 1900–1914.
- John K. Shields - U.S. Senator (1913-1925). Member of Rising Star Lodge #44.
- Tom Stewart - U.S. Senator (1938-1949). Member of Winchester Lodge #158.
- Hopkins L. Turney - U.S. Senator (1845-1851); U.S. Representative; Tennessee Representative. Member of Olive Branch Lodge #53.
- Lawrence Tyson - U.S. Senator (1925-1929); Tennessee Representative (1903-1905). Member of Knoxville Lodge #718.
- Washington C. Whitthorne - U.S. Senator (1886-1887); U.S. Representative; Tennessee Representative; Tennessee Senator. Member of Columbia Lodge #31.
- John Williams - U.S. Senator (1815-1823). Member of Overton Lodge #5.
- Jo Byrns - Speaker of the United States House of Representatives (1935). Past Master of West Nashville Phoenix Lodge #131 (1906, 1907).

=== United States presidents ===
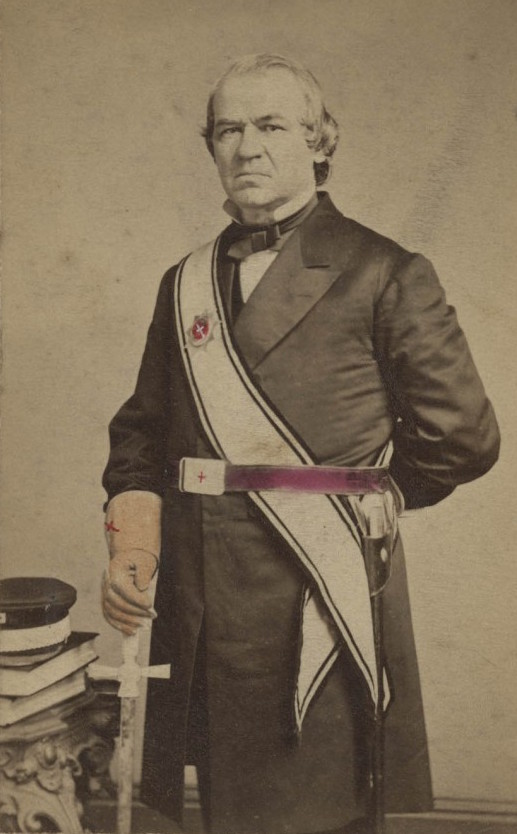
Andrew Johnson wearing the uniform of a Knight Templar.

- Andrew Jackson - 7th President of the United States. Likely initiated in St. Tammany Lodge #1 between 1788 and 1800; Royal Arch Mason, likely receiving the degrees in lodge, but was never a member of a Chapter; Grand Master of Tennessee in 1822, 1823. Andrew Jackson is the only Grand Master of Tennessee who had never served as a Worshipful Master or Warden of a lodge.
- Andrew Johnson - 17th President of the United States. Initiated in Greeneville Lodge #119 in 1851; Knight Templar; received the Scottish Rite Degrees in the White House on June 20, 1867.
- James K. Polk - 11th President of the United States; 9th Governor of Tennessee. Initiated in Columbia Lodge #31 on September 4, 1820; received Holy Royal Arch Degrees in Cumberland Chapter #1 and LaFayette Chapter #4 in 1825.

=== Governors ===
- William B. Bate - 23rd Governor of Tennessee. Member of King Solomon Lodge #94.
- Ray Blanton - 44th Governor of Tennessee. Member of Adamsville Lodge #338.
- Aaron V. Brown - 11th Governor of Tennessee. Member of LaFayette Lodge #51.
- John C. Brown - 19th Governor of Tennessee. Grand Master of Tennessee in 1870; member of Pulaski Lodge #101.
- Gordon Browning - 38th Governor of Tennessee. Member of Huntington Lodge #106.
- John P. Buchanan - 25th Governor of Tennessee. Member of Mt. Moriah Lodge #18.
- William B. Campbell - 14th Governor of Tennessee. Member of Lebanon Lodge #98.
- Newton Cannon - 8th Governor of Tennessee. Member of Hiram Lodge #7.
- Frank Clement - 41st Governor of Tennessee. Member of Dickson Lodge #468.
- Winfield Dunn - 43rd Governor of Tennessee. Member of Corinthian Lodge #414.
- John Eaton - 1st Governor of Florida Territory; U.S. Minister to Spain; Secretary of War; U.S. Senator. Member of Cumberland Lodge #8.
- Buford Ellington - 42nd Governor of Tennessee. Member of Dillahunty Lodge #112.
- James B. Frazier - 28th Governor of Tennessee. Member of Chattanooga Lodge #199.
- William Hall - 7th Governor of Tennessee. Member of King Solomon Lodge #6.
- Isham G. Harris - 16th Governor of Tennessee. Member of Paris Lodge #108; elected Grand Orator of the Grand Lodge in 1851 (but was unable to serve that term) and 1868.
- Sam Houston - 6th Governor of Tennessee; 1st and 3rd President of the Republic of Texas; 7th Governor of Texas. Initiated in 1817 in Cumberland Lodge # 8 in Nashville. Knighted in Washington Commandery #1 in Washington, D.C., on February 3, 1853.
- Jim Nance McCord - 40th Governor of Tennessee. Member of Dillahunty Lodge #112.
- Ned McWherter - 46th Governor of Tennessee. Member of Dresden Lodge #90.
- James D. Porter - 20th Governor of Tennessee. Member of Paris Lodge #108.
- Archibald Roane - 2nd Governor of Tennessee. Member of Tennessee Lodge #2.
- Albert H. Roberts - 33rd Governor of Tennessee. Member of Livingston Lodge #259.
- Dewitt Clinton Senter - 18th Governor of Tennessee. Lodge membership unknown.
- John Sevier - 1st Governor of Tennessee. First Worshipful Master of Tennessee Lodge #2 in Knoxville.
- Alfred A. Taylor - 34th Governor of Tennessee; U.S. Representative. Member of Johnson City Lodge #486.
- Robert Love Taylor - 24th Governor of Tennessee. Member of Dashiell Lodge #238 at Elizabethton, Tennessee.
- Peter Turney - 26th Governor of Tennessee. Member of Winchester Lodge #158.
- Archibald Yell - 2nd Governor of Arkansas. Likely initiated in Warren Lodge #19 in Fayetteville, Tennessee; Worshipful Master of Shelbyville Lodge #49 in 1824; received Holy Royal Arch Degrees in Cumberland Chapter #1 in 1824; Grand Master of Tennessee in 1832; founded first Masonic lodge in Arkansas in 1837.

== Jurists ==
- John Overton - Judge of the Superior Court of Tennessee. Member of St. Tammany Lodge #1; Worshipful Master of Cumberland Lodge #8; received Holy Royal Arch Degrees Cumberland Chapter #4 on February 14, 1823.
- Robert L. Caruthers - Justice of the Tennessee Supreme Court. Grand Master of Tennessee in 1849.
- John C. Crawford - Justice of the Blount County Court. Knight Templar and 32nd Degree Mason.

== Frontiersmen ==
- John Sevier - The founding father of Tennessee, frontiersmen and Governor of the first State of Franklin (Watagua County)
- Davy Crockett - Frontiersmen and folk hero; U.S. Representative (1827-1831; 1833–1835).
- James Robertson - Explorer. May have been initiated in 1787 in North Carolina; member of St. Tammany Lodge #1.

== Military ==
- Nathan Bedford Forrest - Confederate Army General. Initiated in Angenora Lodge #168, but never advanced past the Entered Apprentice degree.
