= Grand Lodge of Tennessee =

Main governing body of Freemasonry within Tennessee

- Established: 1813
- Location: USA
- Region served: Tennessee
- Grand Master: Joseph Wesley Edens
- Website: grandlodge-tn.org

The Grand Lodge of Tennessee, officially the Grand Lodge of the Ancient and Honorable Fraternity of Free and Accepted Masons of the State of Tennessee, is the main governing body of Freemasonry within Tennessee. This Grand Lodge was established in Knoxville, Tennessee, on December 27, 1813, by nine Masonic lodges operating within the state. In 2017, the Grand Lodge of Tennessee had a reported membership of 34,858 Master Masons, and by 2020 the membership had fallen only slightly to 33,200.

The Grand Lodge is headquartered in Nashville, Tennessee, in the Grand Lodge Building.

== History ==
=== Formation ===
Freemasonry in Tennessee began in 1789 when St. Tammany Lodge #1 was organized in Nashville under dispensation from the Grand Lodge of North Carolina. St. Tammany Lodge received its full charter from the Grand Lodge of North Carolina in January 1796 and later changed its name to Harmony Lodge #1 in November 1800. Harmony Lodge 1 was dissolved due to inactivity on December 9, 1808.

As part of regularity, lodges must receive a dispensation from a duly recognised Grand Lodge to begin work and then receive a charter from that Grand Lodge to be a fully established lodge. The original lodges in Tennessee were chartered by the Grand Lodge of North Carolina, which from 1803 to 1813 used the name "The Grand Lodge of North Carolina and Tennessee." The Grand Lodge of North Carolina established nine lodges in Tennessee before the Grand Lodge of Tennessee was formed.

The second lodge was Tennessee Lodge #2 in Knoxville, Tennessee, which received its dispensation from the Grand Lodge of North Carolina on January 15, 1800, and its Charter on November 30, 1800, with John Sevier as its first Worshipful Master. Greeneville Lodge #3 in Greeneville, Tennessee, was granted dispensation on September 5, 1801, and chartered on December 11, 1801. Newport Lodge #4 in Newport, Tennessee, was granted dispensation in 1805 and chartered on December 5, 1806. Overton Lodge #5 in Rogersville, Tennessee, was granted dispensation in 1806 and Chartered on November 21, 1807. Hiram Lodge #7 in Franklin, Tennessee, was granted dispensation in 1808 and Chartered on December 11, 1809. Cumberland Lodge #8 in Nashville, Tennessee, was granted dispensation on June 24, 1812, and was later chartered by the Grand Lodge of Tennessee on February 8, 1814. Western Star Lodge #9 in Port Royal, Tennessee, was granted dispensation on May 1, 1812, and chartered by the Grand Lodge of North Carolina on February 12, 1813.

A convention was held in Knoxville with representatives from the lodges operating in Tennessee, and, on December 2, 1811, the convention adopted a resolution to form a Grand Lodge within Tennessee and petition the Grand Lodge of North Carolina and Tennessee to release its jurisdiction over the State of Tennessee. On December 5, 1812, the Grand Lodge of North Carolina and Tennessee adopted a resolution approving the petition, and on September 30, 1813, the Grand Lodge of North Carolina and Tennessee released its jurisdiction over the Tennessee lodges so they may establish the Grand Lodge of Tennessee. A Grand Convention was held in Knoxville on December 27, 1813 to establish the Grand Lodge and elect the officers. Thomas Claiborne, an attorney and member of the Tennessee General Assembly from Davidson County, was unanimously elected Grand Master. He appointed George Wilson, an attorney and member of the General Assembly from Knox County, as Deputy Grand Master; John Hall as Grand Senior Warden; Abraham Shaifer as Grand Junior Warden; Thomas McCorry as Grand Treasurer; and Edward Scott as Grand Secretary.

=== Schools ===
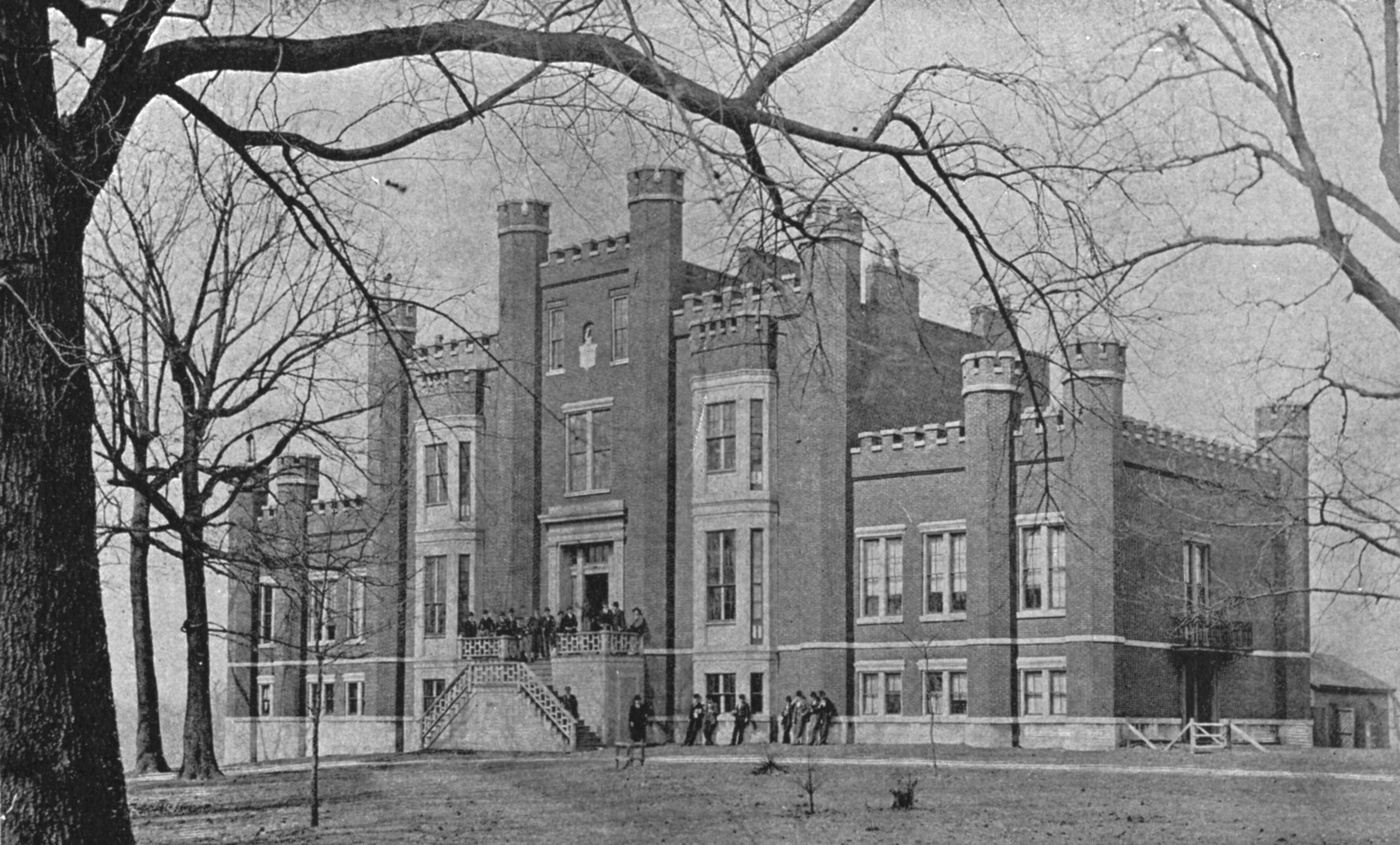
The Masonic University in 1850 in Clarksville, Tennessee.

During the mid-1800s, local lodges established or sponsored several schools and colleges. These included the Masonic Female Institute in Hartsville, the Masonic Male College in Gallatin, the Clifton Masonic Academy in Clifton, the Petersburg Masonic Academy in Petersburg, the Macon Masonic Male College in Macon, the Sale Creek Male and Female Institute in Sale Creek, the Hiwassee Masonic Institute in Charleston, the Masonic College in Dayton, and the Masonic & Odd Fellows College in Nolensville.

The Grand Lodge of Tennessee established the Masonic University in Clarksville, Tennessee, for the education of the children and orphans of indigent Masons. The Masonic University began operating in 1849 as the "Masonic College" with an enrollment of 105 students. In 1850, the Grand Lodge completed the main building for the school. This building became known as Castle Building because of its distinctive architecture, and it stood until its collapse in 1946. In 1855, the Masonic University was purchased by the Presbyterian Church and renamed Stewart College in honor of the college's president. Stewart College was later renamed "Southwestern Presbyterian College" in 1875, and renamed "Southwestern" when the school moved to Memphis, Tennessee, in 1925. It was later renamed Rhodes College in 1984. The original campus of the Masonic University is now the site of Austin Peay State University.

== Grand Masters ==
Notable Grand Masters from Tennessee include:

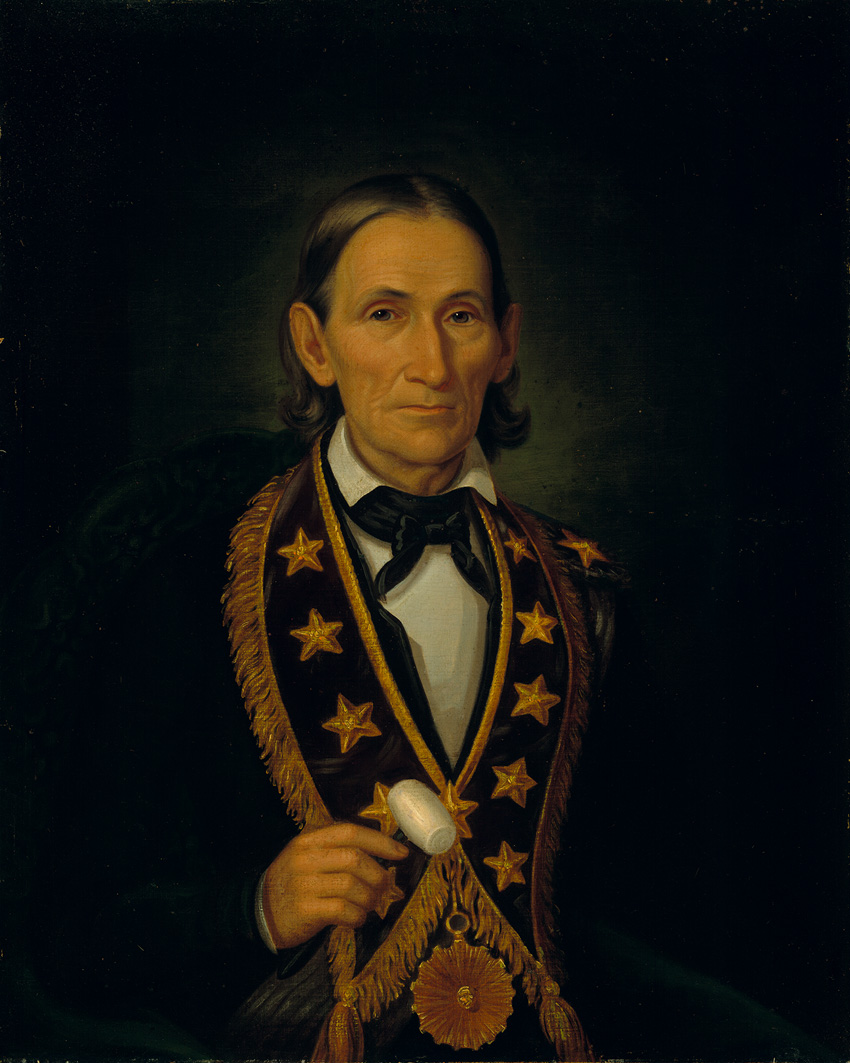
Thomas Claiborne, a lawyer politician in Nashville, was elected the first Grand Master at the formation of the Grand Lodge of Tennessee.

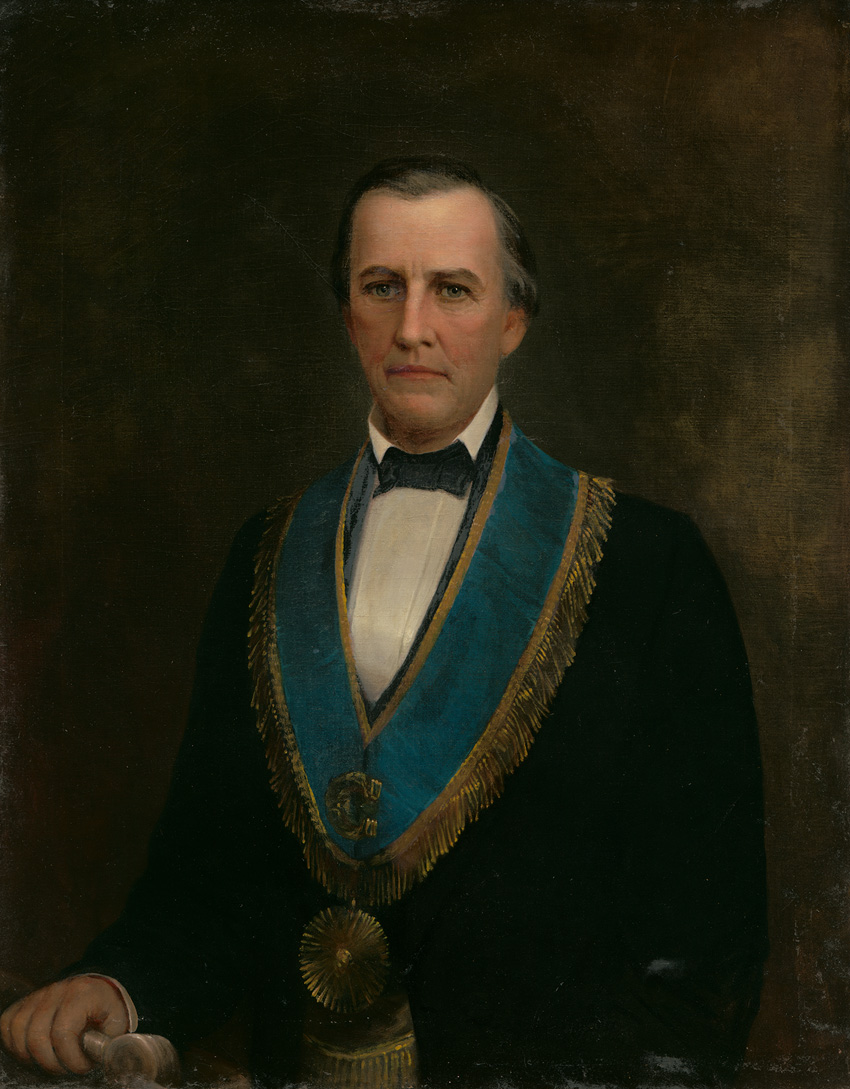
Archibald Yell served as Grand Master in 1831. He later served as the second Governor of the State of Arkansas from 1840-1844.

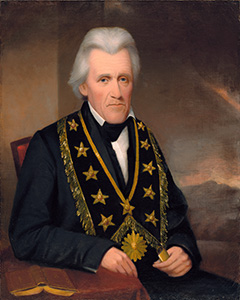
Andrew Jackson, 7th President of the United States (1829-1837), served two terms as Grand Master in 1822 and 1823.

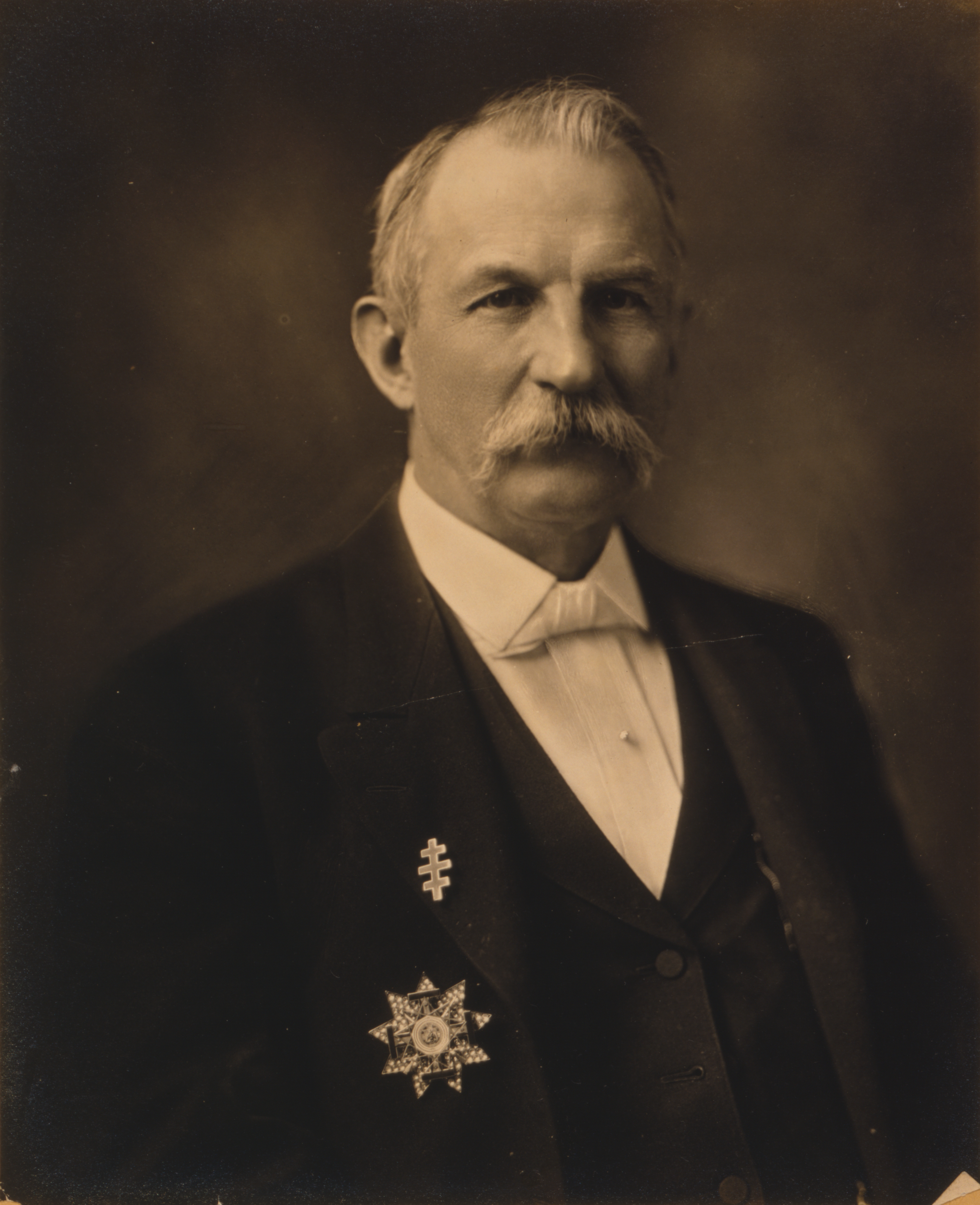
James D. Richardson, Grand Master in 1873 (pictured with his insignia as Sovereign Grand Commander of the Scottish Rite's Supreme Council), was the U.S. House of Representatives' Minority Leader from 1899 to 1903.

- 1813: Thomas Claiborne
- 1817: Wilkins F. Tannehill
- 1822: Andrew Jackson
- 1831: Archibald Yell
- 1849: Robert Looney Caruthers
- 1870: John C. Brown
- 1873: James D. Richardson

== See also ==
- List of Tennessee Freemasons
