= Nashville Banner =

American daily newspaper

- Nashville Banner, final print edition, February 20, 1998
- Type: Evening Newspaper (Monday–Friday)
- Format: Digital
- Publisher: Nashville Public Media
- Editor: Steve Cavendish
- Managing editor: Andrea Tudhope
- Founded: April 10, 1876
- Ceased publication: February 20, 1998 (original print edition)
- Political alignment: Moderate
- Language: English
- Headquarters: P.O.Box 41972, Nashville, TN 37204
- Website: nashvillebanner.com

The Nashville Banner is a nonprofit digital newspaper in Nashville, Tennessee, originated in its current form in 2024. It previously was published as a print daily from April 10, 1876, until February 20, 1998.

The original Banner was published each Monday through Friday afternoon (as well as Saturdays until the 1990s and Sundays until 1937), and at one time carried as many as five editions. The Banner was long a voice of conservative viewpoints in contrast to its liberal morning counterpart, The Tennessean, although these views were greatly moderated in the paper's twilight years.

After ceasing print publication in 1988, The Banner was relaunched on March 18, 2024, as a nonprofit digital-only news outlet, funded by sponsorships and donations. In its relaunch, the outlet has been significantly less conservative and is regarded as moderate.

== History ==
The first edition of the Nashville Banner was published on April 10, 1876. It was begun as a voice for the railroads and other interests in comparison with other area papers of the time which tended to take the viewpoint of workers and unions. It was long controlled by the Stahlman family.

The Banner was an evening paper, which at one time published as many as five editions (first, second, market final, sports final, and sunset final), although these were later consolidated into three editions, and eventually, two. For many years it was in a superior financial condition to its competitors, and in fact, when the rival Tennessean went bankrupt and almost had to cease publication, the Banner assisted in its purchase by the Evans family, who saved it. The Tennessean and the Banner entered into what was one of the first joint operating agreements in the U.S. in 1937. Under this agreement, which became a common model for many other cities over the next half-century, the papers maintained editorial independence and remained separate as news-gathering organizations. However, they were printed on the same presses, distributed by a common agent, and had a consolidated classified advertising department. They were fierce competitors in the realm of news and ideas, but no longer business competitors in the truest sense.

This arrangement stood both papers in good stead for many years. However, the Banner began to suffer in the post-World War II era from the slow loss of readership that became common to most U.S. evening papers, which was largely attributed to the rise of television.

Though the two papers shared many vital resources, they were vastly different in their editorial agendas. One memorable instance of such differences occurred during the mid-1960s as the merits of Daylight Saving Time were being debated. The Tennessean/Banner offices, at the time, featured a dual-sided clock on the roof. One side had the Tennessean logo, the other had the Banner's. Silliman Evans, Jr., owner of the Tennessean, supported DST and set its clock accordingly during the summer hours, but the Stahlman family, who controlled the Banner, opted to keep their side of the clock on standard time, causing confusion for the many drivers and pedestrians on busy Broadway.

Ed Huddleston wrote for The Banner including coverage of the Civil War in Middle Tennessee in 1965 for the centennial of the war’s end and the fight to save the historic Bijou Theatre, demolished as part of an urban renewal plan and replaced by the Municipal Auditorium.

In the early 1970s the Stahlmans sold the Banner to Gannett, who published it for several years, but in 1979 announced that it was assuming publication of the Tennessean while selling the Banner back to local owners Irby C. Simpkins, Jr., Brownlee O. Currey, and John Jay Hooker (Hooker later sold his stake in the paper to Simpkins and Currey).

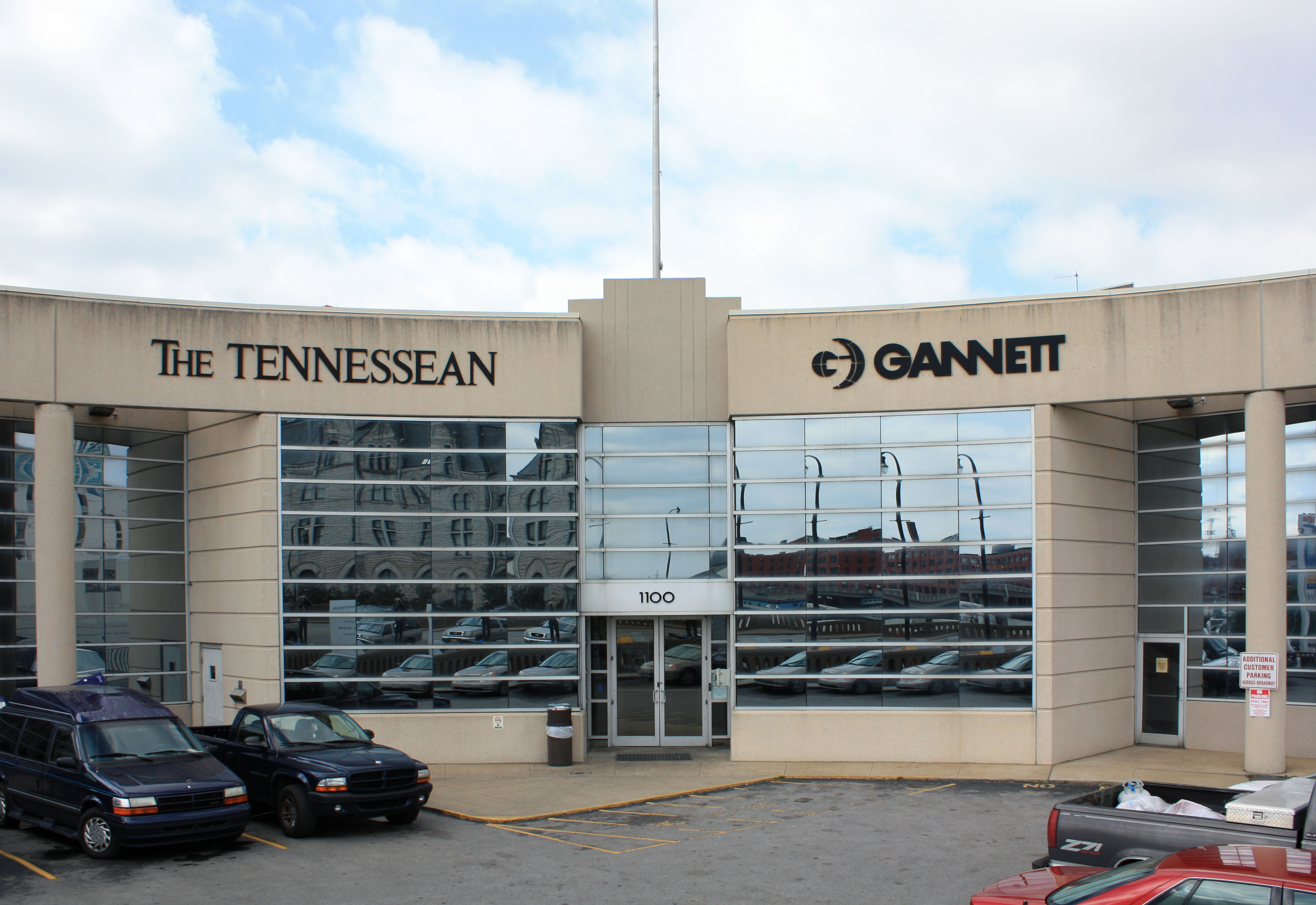
The Banner shared these offices at 1100 Broadway with The Tennessean. The Banner's masthead design occupied the location of the Gannett logo in this photograph, but was removed shortly after the paper ceased publishing.

Although it took almost twenty years, this was the death knell for the Banner. It was now clearly inferior in resources to its morning counterpart, and its circulation continued to shrink. In the 1980s Gannett insisted on renegotiation of the joint operating agreement to its benefit, and the Banner had little choice but to comply. Another reason for the weakness of the Banner was its lack of a Sunday edition comparable to the Tennessean's, which it had given up in the formation of the joint operating agreement. It had since always published on a six-day schedule, and as weekday papers, especially evening weekday papers, continued to decline, it did not have this profit center to draw upon. The Banner switched its Saturday edition for a while to a single, morning edition in direct competition with the Tennessean, then announced that it was terminating its Saturday edition entirely.

During this time, the Banner began to take far more moderate positions on issues on its editorial pages, although it generally remained more conservative than the Tennessean in most areas. It was in the contradictory situation of probably becoming more respected by people, especially those in the journalism community, at the same time that it was becoming less read.

The Banner adopted several new technologies soon before its demise, including early online efforts such as the launch of a daily e-mail newsletter ("Nashville Banner Digest") in 1996, as usage of e-mail and the World Wide Web was becoming more common. It also built and maintained a website nearly a year before The Tennessean, although only five months before the Banner went out of business. The Banner newsroom also became one of the nation's first to convert to the exclusive use of digital photography, completing the conversion just a few months before it ceased publication.

== Closing and relaunch ==
The end of the original Banner occurred when Gannett made the publishers of the Banner a large offer to terminate the joint operating agreement. The offer was approximately $65 million, likely more than any profit that could have been made by the continued publication of the Banner, so it ceased to exist. (This was not considered by the Justice Department to be an antitrust violation, but when Gannett attempted to do the same with its Honolulu Advertiser and the evening paper in that joint operating agreement, the Honolulu Star-Bulletin, only a few months later, it was prosecuted as such, the merger was forestalled, and both papers continued to operate until 2010.)

The Banner's final edition was published on Friday, February 20, 1998. The announcement to close was made public the previous Monday, February 16. Several of the Banner's popular features and reporters, including columnists Mary Hance ("Ms. Cheap") and Joe Biddle (sports), immediately went to The Tennessean.

On March 18, 2024, more than two decades later, the Nashville Banner re-launched as a free digital news outlet, funded by sponsorships and donations. The staff, though small, covers both news in the city of Nashville as well as the state legislature. In its relaunch, the outlet has been significantly less conservative and is regarded as moderate.

== Archives ==
The archives of the Nashville Banner were donated to the Nashville Public Library. The collection features the entire archive, a vending machine with the final edition still displayed in the window, the many awards the paper won over the years, various trinkets from the paper's offices, and a bronze statue of a paperboy selling the Banner which was originally placed on the plaza in front of the Tennessean/Banner offices. The archive is located at the downtown Nashville Public Library on Church Street and is open to the public.

== Circulation history ==
| Calendar Quarter Ended | Avg. paid circ. | % change | cumul. change |
|---|---|---|---|
| December 29, 1991 | 61,746 | n/a | |
| March 29, 1992 | 60,768 | -1.58% | |
| June 28, 1992 | 59,282 | -2.45% | |
| August 7, 1992 | 58,089 | -2.01% | |
| September 27, 1992 | 59,120 | *Sat. edition dropped | |
| December 27, 1992 | 59,949 | 1.40% | -2.91% |
| March 28, 1993 | 58,416 | -2.56% | |
| June 27, 1993 | 56,579 | -3.14% | |
| September 26, 1993 | 56,447 | -0.23% | |
| June 27, 1993 | 56,579 | 0.23% | |
| September 26, 1993 | 56,447 | -0.23% | |
| December 26, 1993 | 56,021 | -0.75% | -9.27% |
| March 27, 1994 | 56,280 | 0.46% | |
| June 26, 1994 | 55,052 | -2.18% | |
| September 25, 1994 | 55,138 | 0.16% | |
| December 26, 1994 | 54,084 | -1.91% | -12.41% |
| March 27, 1995 | 52,769 | -2.43% | |
| June 26, 1995 | 52,793 | 0.05% | |
| September 25, 1995 | 51,180 | -3.06% | |
| December 31, 1995 | 50,814 | -0.72% | -17.70% |
| March 31, 1996 | 49,075 | -3.42% | |
| June 30, 1996 | 47,722 | -2.76% | |
| September 30, 1996 | 46,164 | -3.26% | |
| December 29, 1996 | 44,711 | -3.15% | -27.59% |
| March 30, 1997 | 44,031 | -1.52% | |
| June 29, 1997 | 42,660 | -3.11% | |
| September 28, 1997 | 41,541 | -2.62% | |
| December 27, 1997 | 40,466 | -2.59% | |
| December 28, 1997 to February 20, 1998 | 40,633 | 0.41% | -34.19% |

Source: Audit Bureau of Circulations reports on Nashville Banner, March 1997 and June 1998.

== Notable contributors ==
=== Original print edition ===
- Ralph McGill (sports editor)
- Roy Neel (lobbyist)
- Fred Russell (sports editor)
- Christine Sadler (journalist)
- Buster Olney (ESPN.com senior writer)
- Lamar Alexander (Vanderbilt campus correspondent)

== See also ==
- List of defunct newspapers of the United States
- The Tennessean
- The City Paper
