= William Wills =

William Wills may refer to:

- William Wills, 1st Baron Winterstoke (1830–1911), British businessman and peer
- William Gorman Wills (1828–1891), Irish dramatist and painter
- William Henry Wills (journalist) (1810–1880), journalist, newspaper editor and friend of Charles Dickens
- William Henry Wills (politician) (1882–1946), American politician and governor of Vermont
- William John Wills (1834–1861), English explorer and second-in-command of the Burke and Wills expedition
- William Day Wills (1791–1865), British tobacco merchant
- William Ridley Wills (Insurance executive) (1871–1949) Founder, National Life and Accident Insurance Co.
- William Ridley Wills (1897–1957), American novelist, poet, and journalist
- Ridley Wills II (born 1934) Full name: William Ridley Wills II – American businessman, author, historian
- William S. S. Willes (1819–1871), Mormon pioneer
