= Edwin Mims =

United States professor of English literature

- Born: May 27, 1872; Richmond, Arkansas, U.S.
- Died: September 15, 1959 (aged 87); Nashville, Tennessee, U.S.
- Resting place: Woodlawn Memorial Park
- Education: Webb School
- Alma mater: Vanderbilt University; Cornell University
- Occupation: University professor
- Parent(s): Andrew Jackson Mims; Cornelia Williamson

Edwin Mims (1872–1959) was an American university professor of English literature. He served as the chair of the English Department at Vanderbilt University in Nashville, Tennessee, for thirty years from 1912 to 1942, and he taught many members of the Fugitives and the Southern Agrarians, two literary movements in the South. He was a staunch opponent of lynching and a practicing Methodist.

== Early life ==
Edwin Mims was born in 1872 in Richmond, Arkansas, near Texarkana. His father was Andrew Jackson Mims and his mother, Cornelia Williamson. He had a brother, Stewart L. Mims, who later resided in Greenwich, Connecticut.

Mims was educated at the Webb School in Bell Buckle, Tennessee. He graduated from Vanderbilt University with a Bachelor of Arts degree in 1892 and a Master of Arts degree in 1893. He was also the editor of The Vanderbilt Hustler, the main campus newspaper. He earned a PhD from Cornell University in 1900.

== Career ==
Mims began his career at his alma mater, Vanderbilt University, where he became an assistant professor in 1892. He was a professor of English at Duke University (then known as Trinity College) in Durham, North Carolina, and later at the University of North Carolina at Chapel Hill in Chapel Hill, North Carolina.

The second Chancellor of Vanderbilt University, James Hampton Kirkland (1859–1939), convinced him to return to his alma mater to teach. He went on to serve as the Chair of the English Department at Vanderbilt University from 1912 to 1942. One of his requirements was to ask his students to learn a thousand verses of poetry by heart. He also asked students to write an autobiographical essay each year. He wrote a history of Vanderbilt University as well as of Chancellor Kirkland. Some of his students included Donald Davidson, Robert Penn Warren, Cleanth Brooks, Andrew Nelson Lytle, Allen Tate, Merrill Moore and Jesse Stuart. Stuart's Beyond Dark Hills, was the direct result of one of Mims's assignments (writing an autobiographical essay); it was published in 1938. During his tenure as chair, he wrote to Chancellor Kirkland to discourage him to match the offer that Kenyon College in Gambier, Ohio, had made to his colleague John Crowe Ransom, so that Ransom would leave for Ohio instead. However, Allen Tate tried to expose his hypocrisy as Mims assured Ransom he would be welcome to stay in his department at Vanderbilt. Another colleague, Lyle H. Lanier, agreed that this demonstrated Mims's hypocrisy.

A progressive, Mims became vocal in his opposition to lynching. He established the Law and Order League, an anti-lynching organization. He also addressed the New York Southern Society in New York City, where he reiterated his opposition to lynching. His 1926 book entitled The Advancing South was a call to action for progressives in the South. It was reviewed favourably by Alain Leroy Locke (1885–1954) in Opportunity: A Journal of Negro Life.

Mims served as President of the Association of Colleges and Secondary Schools for Southern States, later known as the Southern Association of Colleges and Schools, in 1902. He then served on its executive committee. He lectured at the Chautauqua Institution in 1912–1942. He was also a member of the Methodist Episcopal Church and served on the joint hymn book commission between the Methodist Episcopal Church, North and the Methodist Episcopal Church, South in 1902–1903.

== Personal life, death and legacy ==
In June 1898, Mims married Clara Puryear, the daughter of a tobacco broker from Paducah, Kentucky. They had four children: Edwin, Catherine, Thomas and Ella. His daughter Ella was active in the Nashville chapter of the Southern Regional Council.

Mims died on September 15, 1959, in Nashville. His funeral took place at the West End United Methodist Church on the edge of the Vanderbilt University campus, and he was buried at the Woodlawn Memorial Park in Nashville, Tennessee. His pallbearers included Richmond Beatty, Harvie Branscomb, Walter Clyde Curry, Hugh Jackson Morgan, Charles Madison Sarratt, and Herbert Charles Sanborn.

A pair of statues representing Dismas and Lazarus in the foyer of the Benton Chapel on the campus of Vanderbilt University are dedicated in his honor. The Edwin Mims Professorship at Vanderbilt University is named in his honor. It was the result of a fundraising campaign by alumnus Lucius E. Burch Jr. (1912–1996).

== Bibliography ==
- Advancing South: Stories of Progress and Reaction (New York, New York: Doubleday, 1926).
- Adventurous America: A Study of Contemporary Life and Thought (New York, New York: C. Scribner's Sons, 1929).
- Chancellor Kirkland of Vanderbilt (Nashville, Tennessee: Vanderbilt University Press, 1939).
- History of Vanderbilt University (Nashville, Tennessee: Vanderbilt University Press, 1946).
- The Christ of the poets (Nashville, Tennessee: Abingdon-Cokesbury Press, 1948).
- A Biography of Sidney Lanier
- Great Writers As Interpreters of Religion
