= Rogers Caldwell =

American businessman and banker (1890–1968)

- Born: Rogers Clark Caldwell; January 25, 1890; Nashville, Tennessee, U.S.
- Died: October 8, 1968 (aged 78); Franklin, Tennessee, U.S.
- Resting place: Mount Olivet Cemetery
- Education: Montgomery Bell Academy; Vanderbilt University (did not graduate)
- Occupations: Businessman, banker
- Spouse: Margaret Trousdale
- Parent(s): James Erwin Caldwell; May Winston

Rogers Caldwell (January 25, 1890 – October 8, 1968) was an American businessman and banker from Tennessee. He was known as the "J. P. Morgan of the South." He was the founder and president of Caldwell and Company and its subsidiary, the Bank of Tennessee. He was the president of the Tennessee Hart-Parr Company, which sold tractors in the Southern United States, mechanizing agriculture, and the president of the Kentucky Rock and Asphalt company, which built infrastructure and roads in Tennessee. With his friend and business associate politician Luke Lea, he owned newspapers in Tennessee.

In the wake of the Wall Street crash of 1929, Caldwell and Company went bankrupt, leading up to nearly 100 bank failures across the Southern United States, in what was called the "greatest financial disaster which Tennessee has ever experienced" by the Tennessee General Assembly, and resulting in the loss of over $6 million in funds to the Tennessee state treasury, equivalent to about $72 million in 2016. Caldwell was indicted for breach of trust in Tennessee and Kentucky, and sentenced to prison in Tennessee but this verdict was overturned by the Tennessee Supreme Court and he was never extradited to Kentucky. His Hogan Road mansion south of Nashville was later seized by the state of Tennessee and turned into what is now the Ellington Agricultural Center.

== Early life ==
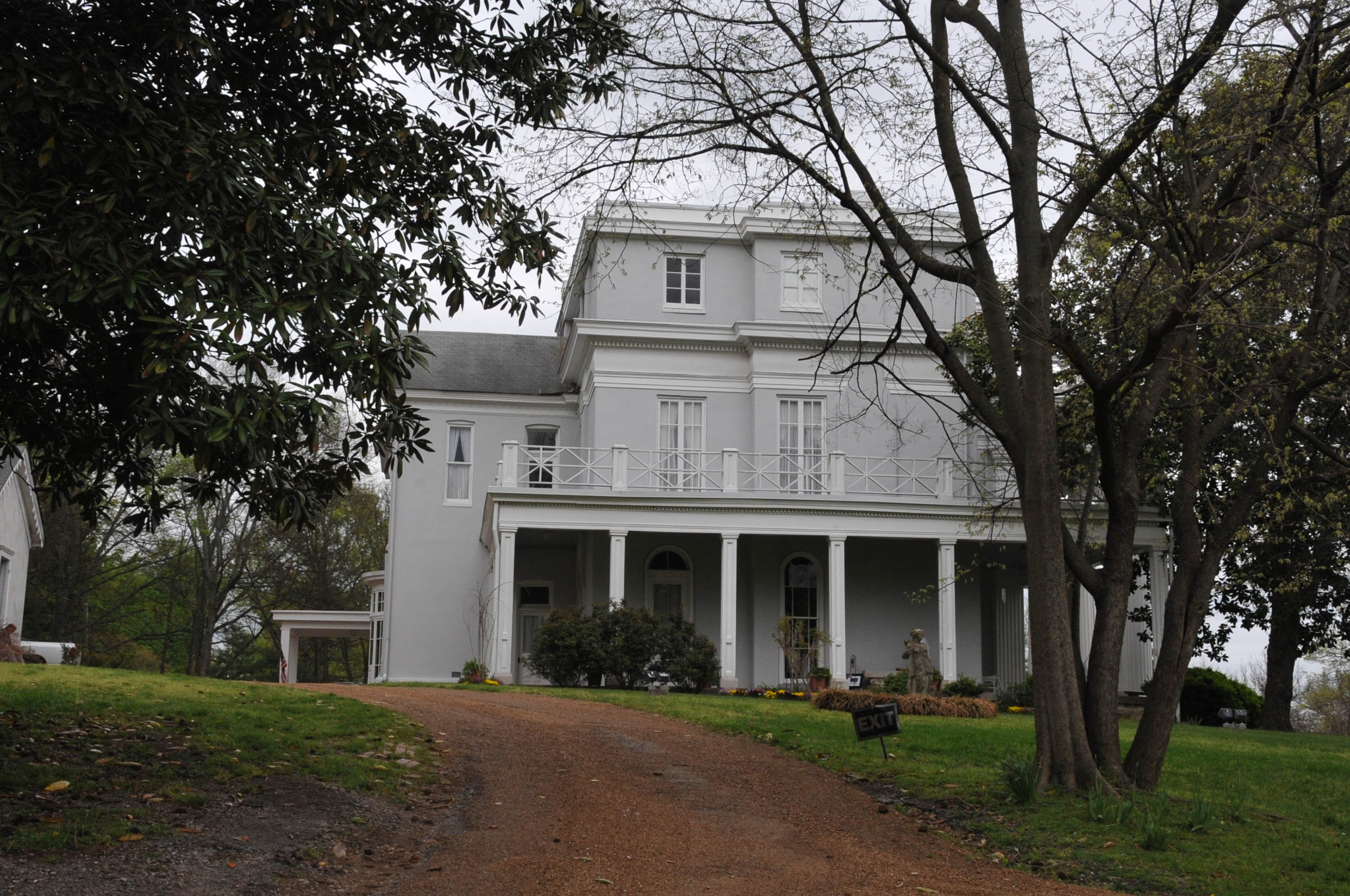
Longview, Caldwell's childhood home, now listed on the National Register of Historic Places.

Rogers Caldwell was born on January 25, 1890, in Nashville, Tennessee. His father, James Erwin Caldwell, was a businessman. His mother was May Winston. He grew up at the Longview mansion.

Caldwell was educated at the Montgomery Bell Academy in Nashville. He attended Vanderbilt University from 1908 to 1910, but he dropped out before graduating. However, he continued to attend Vanderbilt Commodores football games.

== Career ==
Caldwell started his career by working for his father's insurance company in the early 1910s. He joined the Nashville Business Men's Association in 1916.

Caldwell founded his own insurance company, Caldwell and Company, in 1917. The firm invested in bonds throughout the Southern United States. His marketshare grew after World War I by insuring construction company engaged in building infrastructure and roads in the South. Additionally, in 1919 Caldwell founded the Bank of Tennessee, a subsidiary of Caldwell and Company. The firm was a depository bank for insurance bonds. That same year, he served as the president of the Tennessee Hart-Parr Company, which sold tractors in Kentucky and Tennessee, mechanizing Southern agriculture.

Caldwell acquired "insurance companies, banks, textile mills, oil companies, department stores" throughout the 1920s. With politician Luke Lea, he acquired banks and two newspapers, Memphis Commercial Appeal and the Knoxville Journal. (Lea also controlled the Nashville Tennessean.) When Henry Horton, Lea's friend and business associate, became Governor of Tennessee in 1927, Caldwell and Lea received no-bid contracts to build highways in the state with their Kentucky Rock and Asphalt company. This became known as the "Kyrock Scandal."

Caldwell was appointed to the State Funding Board of Tennessee, which awarded a no-bid contract to the Bank of Tennessee, which sold millions of bonds to the state coffers. In 1930, it acquired the Banco-Kentucky Company, formerly owned by James B. Brown, which was interpreted by the press as a sign that Southern banking was becoming less reliant on New York banking. However, the company was declared insolvent later that year in the wake of the Wall Street crash of 1929. As a result, 10 banks closed down in Tennessee as well as 15 banks in North Carolina and 70 banks in Arkansas, including 45 banks of A.B. Banks, an Arkansas-based subsidiary of the Bank of Tennessee. The state affairs investigative committee of the Tennessee General Assembly called it the "greatest financial disaster which Tennessee has ever experienced."

Caldwell was sued in the Chancery Court of Davidson County, Tennessee in December 1930. He was also criminally indicted by the states of Tennessee and Kentucky in 1931. He was convicted of "breach of trust" in the state of Tennessee and sentenced to prison, but this ruling was overturned by the Tennessee Supreme Court, and he was never extradited to Kentucky. Nevertheless, his estate, Brentwood Hall, was taken from him by the state of Tennessee in 1957. Meanwhile, the Tennessee House of Representatives threatened to impeach Governor Horton for conspiring with Lea and Caldwell; although this effort ultimately failed, Horton never sought elected office again.

Caldwell co-founded a new investment banking firm, Rogers Caldwell and Company, in 1932, with only US$1,000.

== Personal life ==
Caldwell married Margaret Trousdale in October 1913. Prior to the wedding, a reception was held at Woodstock, the estate of Judge James C. Bradford, whose nephew was James Cowdon Bradford, Sr., the founder of J.C. Bradford & Co.

The Caldwells resided at Brentwood Hall in Brentwood, Tennessee, near Nashville. From 1957 to 1968, they resided in Franklin, Tennessee.

== Death and legacy ==
Caldwell died on October 8, 1968, in Franklin, Tennessee. He was buried at the Mount Olivet Cemetery in Nashville, Tennessee. His former mansion, Brentwood Hall, is now known as the Ellington Agricultural Center, home to the Tennessee Agricultural Museum.
