= Edmund William Cole =

Confederate veteran and businessman

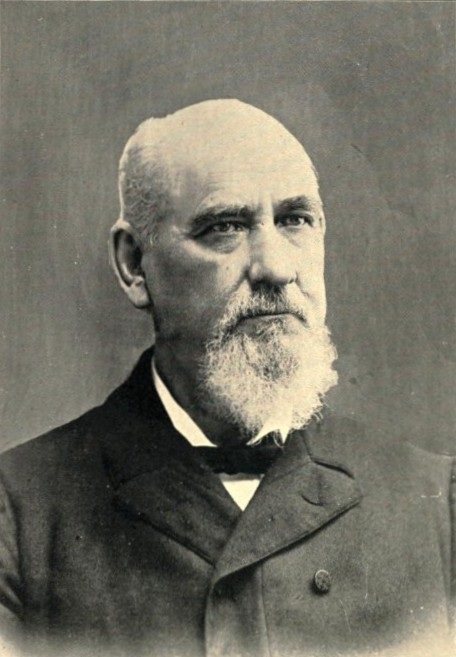
- Born: July 19, 1827; Giles County, Tennessee, U.S.
- Died: May 25, 1899 (aged 71); Manhattan, New York, U.S.
- Occupation: Businessman
- Spouses: Louisa McGavock; Anna Russell Cole
- Military career
- Allegiance: Confederate States of America (1861–1865)
- Branch: Confederate States Army
- Service years: 1861–1865
- Rank: Colonel (CSA)

Colonel Edmund William "King" Cole (July 19, 1827 – May 25, 1899) was an American Confederate veteran and businessman. He was the president of the Nashville, Chattanooga and St. Louis Railway, and the founder of the American National Bank.

== Early life ==
Edmund William Cole was born on July 19, 1827, in Giles County, Tennessee. He grew up on a farm.

== Career ==
Cole moved to Nashville, Tennessee, in 1845, where he worked as a store clerk and later as a bookkeeper in the post office. In 1857, he was appointed as the superintendent of the Nashville & Chattanooga Railroad by its founder, Vernon K. Stevenson.

During the American Civil War of 1861–1865, Cole served as a colonel in the Confederate States Army. He worked as a quartermaster supervising the rail transportation of troops and supplies. General Samuel Jones described Cole as "active and zealous" during the war.

Cole was appointed as the president of the Nashville & Chattanooga Railroad in 1868. Cole acquired four more lines and renamed it the Nashville, Chattanooga and St. Louis Railway in 1873. According to historian Jesse C. Burt, Jr., "His grandiose scheme for uniting disparate pieces of rail properties into a solid and well-managed enterprise was probably the first large rail consolidation to be attempted in the South." When August Belmont purchased it from Stevenson in 1880, Cole resigned, and he was succeeded as president by James D. Porter.

Cole co-founded the American National Bank in 1883. He also invested in real estate in Downtown Nashville and coal mines in Sheffield, Alabama. He was also an investor in the Sheffield Hotel, where he banned the sale of whisky.

== Philanthropy ==
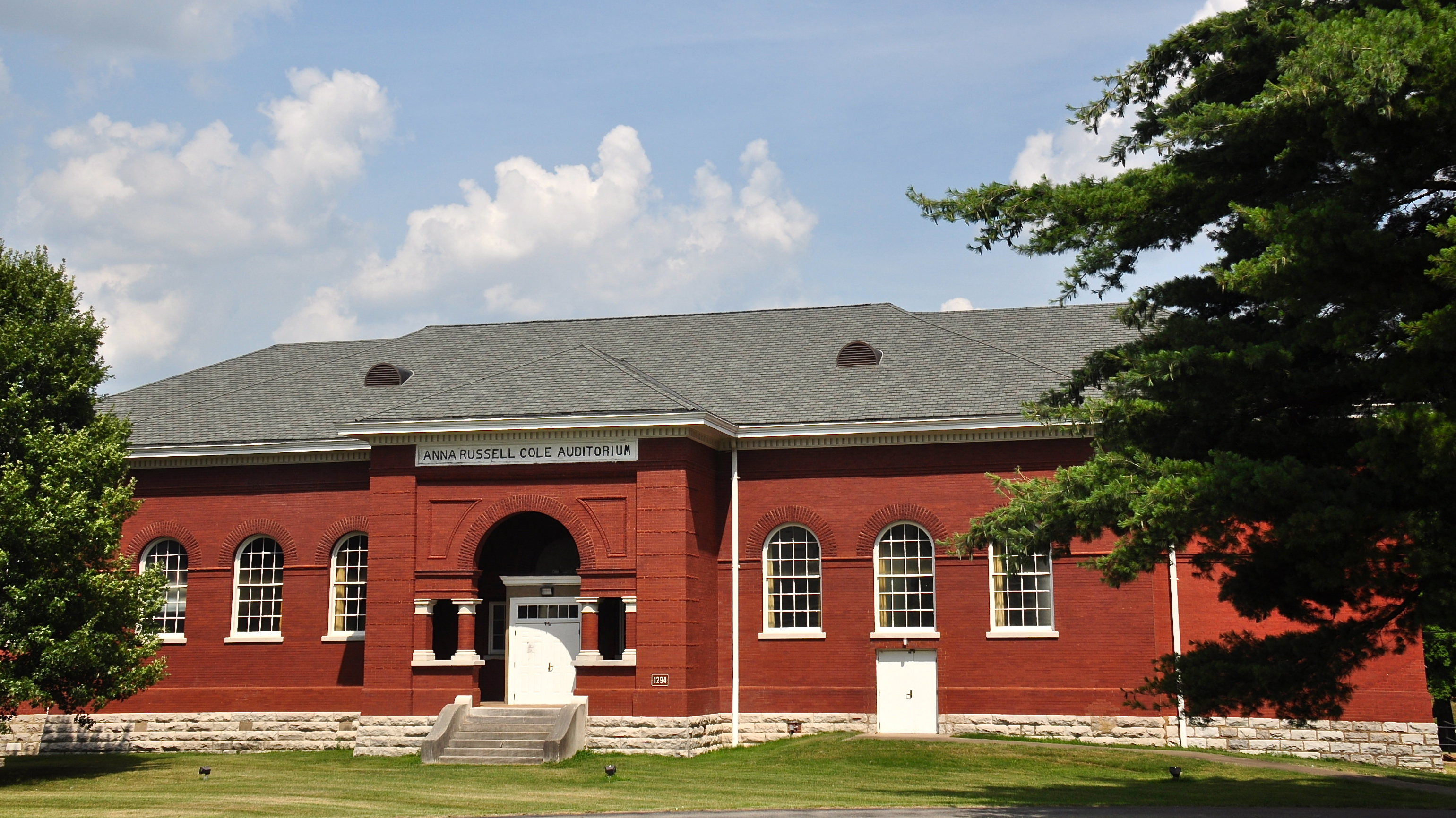
The Anna Russell Cole Auditorium.

In 1885, Cole founded the Randall Cole School, and he hired Dr W. C. Kilvington as superintendent. In 1887, Cole donated it to the state of Tennessee, and it was renamed the Tennessee Industrial School. In 1894, it moved into the Anna Russell Cole Auditorium, named for Cole's second wife.

Cole served as the treasurer of the board of trust of Vanderbilt University. In 1892, he donated $5,000 to endow the annual Cole Lecture, "for the defense and advocacy of the Christian religion."

Cole made a donation to the Bruce family shortly after the Lynching of Ephraim Grizzard in 1892.

== Personal life, death and legacy ==
Cole was married twice. His first wife, Louisa McGavock, died in 1869; her funeral ceremony was conducted by reverends John Berry McFerrin and Robert A. Young. They lived at 182 Church Street. His second wife, Anna Russell, was a native of Augusta, Georgia, whose father had served as the first Democratic mayor of Augusta after the Civil War. Their wedding, conducted by Bishop Holland Nimmons McTyeire, was attended by Confederate veterans Bushrod Johnson and Edmund Kirby Smith. The Coles first resided at Terrace Place, a three-story townhouse on Church Street in Nashville, until they moved into Colemere, a mansion designed for them by Confederate veteran and architect William Crawford Smith. They had a son, Whitefoord Russell Cole, who became a prominent businessman. Cole was a member of the Democratic Party, and he attended the McKendree United Methodist Church.

After an evening meeting with fellow Tennessee businessman Nathaniel Baxter, Cole died of heart disease on May 25, 1899, at the Fifth Avenue Hotel in New York City. His funeral was held at the McKendree United Methodist Church in Nashville. He was buried at Mount Olivet Cemetery. After his death, his widow hired sculptor George Julian Zolnay to design his bust; it was installed in Kirkland Hall, the administration building of Vanderbilt University. When Kirkland Hall burned down in 1905, it was replaced with a marble bust alongside his widow's portrait by Willie Betty Newman.
