= Ridley Wills II =

American author and historian (1934–2025)

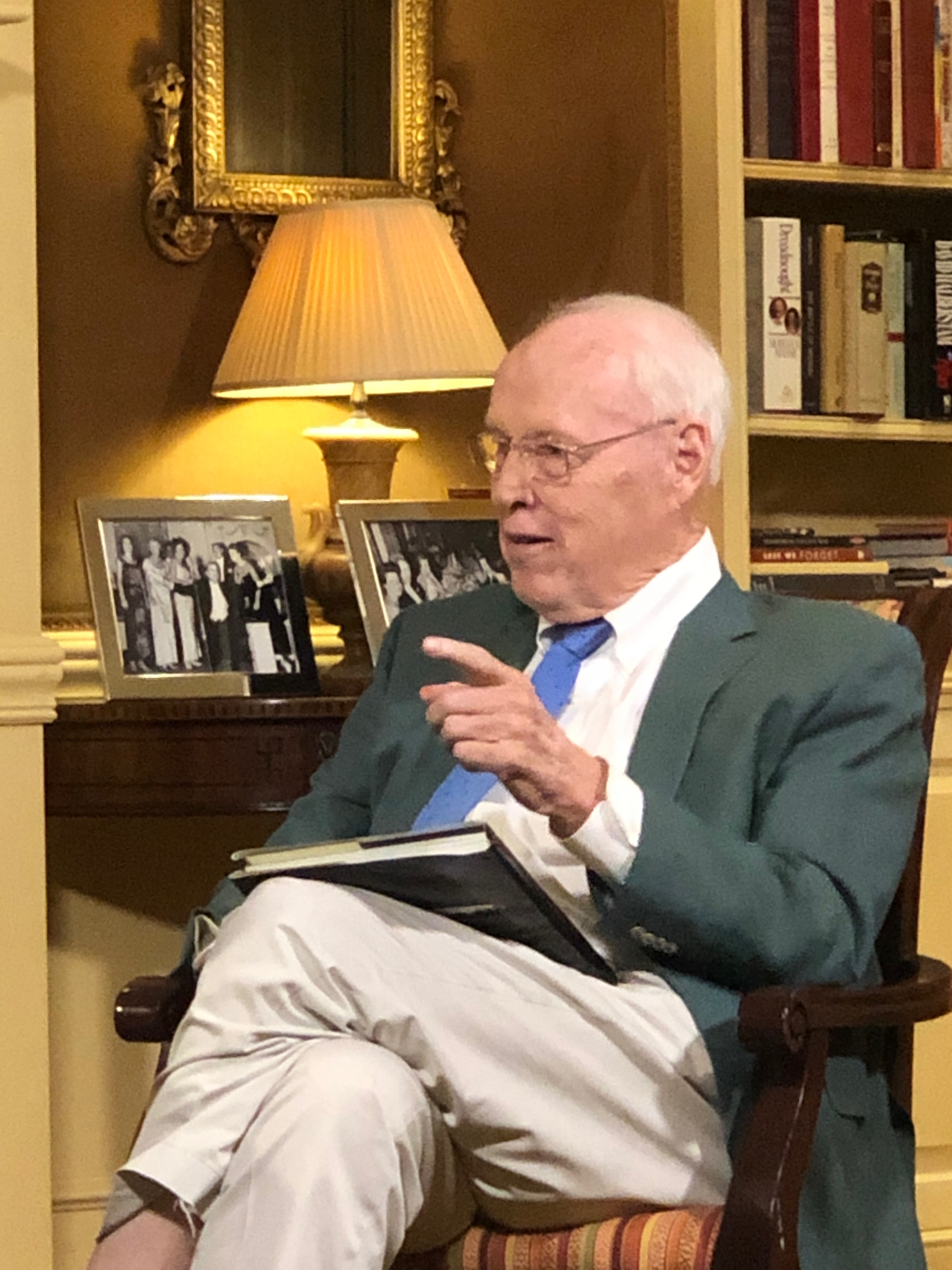
- Wills in 2019
- Born: William Ridley Wills II; June 19, 1934; Nashville, Tennessee, US
- Died: January 16, 2025 (aged 90); Nashville, Tennessee, US
- Education: Vanderbilt University
- Occupations: Author, historian
- Relatives: Jesse Ely Wills (father); William Ridley Wills (cousin); William Ridley Wills (grandfather); William Giles Harding (2nd-great-grandfather)
- Writing career
- Genres: Biography, history, architecture, business

William Ridley Wills II (June 19, 1934 – January 16, 2025) was an American author and historian, who authored 34 historical and biographical books as of 2024. He received the Tennessee History Book Award in 1991 for his first book, The History of Belle Meade: Mansion, Plantation and Stud. He was president of the Tennessee Historical Society and in 2016, was given an Honorary Doctor of Humane Letters from The University of the South. He was an executive of a company founded by his grandfather, the National Life and Accident Insurance Company and was on the boards of trust of Vanderbilt University and Montgomery Bell Academy, a prep school for boys in Nashville.

== Family history ==
Wills was born on June 19, 1934, in Nashville, Tennessee. His grandfather was businessman William Ridley Wills, one of the founders of the National Life and Accident Insurance Company in Nashville in 1902. In 1925, the company launched radio station WSM on the fifth floor of its building and created the country music broadcast, the Grand Ole Opry. The grandfather built a home in Nashville called "Far Hills", which, after his death in 1949, became the permanent residence for the Governor of Tennessee.

Wills' father, Jesse Ely Wills, graduated from Vanderbilt University, Phi Beta Kappa, in 1922. While a student there, Jesse Wills and his older cousin, William Ridley Wills (who had the identical name of Jesse's father), were members of "The Fugitives", a literary movement of the 1920s that included Allen Tate, Robert Penn Warren, John Crowe Ransom, Donald Davidson and Cleanth Brooks. Jesse Wills' sonnets were published in the poetry magazine, The Fugitive in 1923. Jesse Wills became board chairman of the National Life and Accident Insurance Company. He helped establish the "Fugitive Room" as a depository for Fugitive papers and manuscripts as part of a wing of Vanderbilt's Joint University Libraries building.

Wills' mother was Ellen McClung Buckner. His maternal grandmother was Elizabeth Buckner, the granddaughter of William Giles Harding. Wills married Irene Weaver Jackson in 1962.

== Career ==
At his high school at Nashville's Montgomery Bell Academy (MBA), Wills was voted the superlative "Most Daring." He was captain of Vanderbilt's swim team in 1956. Wills went to work for the family firm, National Life, after serving for two years in the US Navy. He had worked his way up to senior vice president by 1982; but then his career path took a radical change. The firm was acquired in a hostile takeover by American General Life and Accident Insurance Company. At that point, Wills said, "the culture changed, and they began doing things differently." He added, "I decided to leave, but I was only 49 years old. I had to figure out what to do next, so I decided I'd raise money for organizations I cared about, serve on their boards, and start writing books."

Wills had a lifelong hobby of collecting historic Tennessee postcards, which may have been the spark for his career as a historical writer. He started teaching night school classes on Nashville history at Belmont and MBA. He put his research skills to work leading up to his first book, The Belle Meade Farm: Its Landmarks and Out-Buildings (1986).

By 2024, Wills had written 34 books, primarily histories and biographies relating to the city of Nashville. Wills served on the Vanderbilt University Board of Trust and was board chair of Montgomery Bell Academy for nine years. He was president and trustee for the Tennessee Historical Society and in 1991 received the Tennessee History Book Award given by the Tennessee Library Association for his work, The History of Belle Meade: Mansion, Plantation and Stud. In 2016, he was given an Honorary Doctor of Humane Letters from The University of the South.

Wills died on January 16, 2025, aged 90, in Nashville.

== List of works ==
- The Belle Meade Farm: Its Landmarks and Out-Buildings (1986)
- Belle Meade Bloodlines 1816–1094 (1990)
- The History of Belle Meade: Mansion, Plantation and Stud (1991)
- A Walking Tour of Mt. Olivet Cemetery (1993)
- A Brief History of the YMCA of Nashville and Middle Tennessee
- Old Enough to Die (1996)
- Touring Tennessee: A Postcard Panorama, 1898-1955 (1996)
- Tennessee Governors at Home: Executive Residences of Tennessee's First Families (1999)
- Two Centuries at Meeting of the Waters (1999)
- Joe C. Davis Jr. 1919–1989 (2001)
- Belle Meade Country Club: The First 100 Years (2001)
- Gentleman, Scholar, Athlete: The History of Montgomery Bell Academy (2005)
- Yours to Count On: A Biography of Nashville Banker Extraordinaire Sam M. Fleming (2007)
- Elizabeth and Matt, a Love Story (2007)
- Jessie and Ridley: They Made a Difference (2008)
- The Hermitage At One Hundred: Nashville's First Million Dollar Hotel(2009)
- Heritage, Highballs and Hijinks: Colorful Characters I've Known (2010)
- The YMCA of Middle Tennessee: Three Centuries of Service (2011)
- Nashville Streets and Their Stories (2012)
- Lest We Forget: Nashville's Lost Businesses and Their Stories (2013)
- Disastrous Deaths: From the Dueling Grounds on Red River to Murder on Elm Hill Pike (2014)
- Nashville Pikes, Volume One: 150 Years Along Franklin and Granny White Pikes (2015)
- Nashville Pikes, Volume Two: 150 Years along Hillsboro Pike (2016)
- Nashville Pikes, Volume Three: 150 Years Along Harding Pike (2017)
- Nashville Pikes, Volume Four: 150 Years Along Charlotte, Clifton and Hydes Ferry Pikes (2017)
- Nashville Pikes, Volume Five: 150 Years Along Buena Vista, Whites Creek, Brick Church, and Dickerson Pikes (2018)
- Nashville Pikes, Volume Six: 150 Years Along Gallatin and Vaughn Pikes (2019)
- Nashville Pikes, Volume Seven: 150 Years Along McGavock and Lebanon Pikes (2020)
- Nashville Pikes, Volume Eight: The Hub of the Wheel: The Old City, 1780–1889 (2020)
- Chickering Road and Its People (2020)
- Belle Meade: A Legacy of Land, Lives, and Love (2021)
- Nashville History Corner Articles (2022)
- My Life Journey With Irene (2023)
- Belle Meade Country Club Members' Contributions to "The Greatest Generation" (2024)

== Honors and awards ==
- Chairman YMCA Foundation of Metropolitan Nashville, 1984
- President Tennessee Historical Society 1985–1987
- Honorary Doctor of Humane Letters from The University of the South, (2016).
- National Trust for History Preservation, 1988–1991
- United Way De Tocqueville Award, 1989
- Tennessee History Book Award, 1991
- Distinguished Alumnus Award, Montgomery Bell Academy, 1996
- Trustee, Cumberland Museum and Science Center, 1984
- H.G. Hill Award, YMCA of Middle Tennessee, 2003
