= Willie Betty Newman =

American painter (1863–1935)

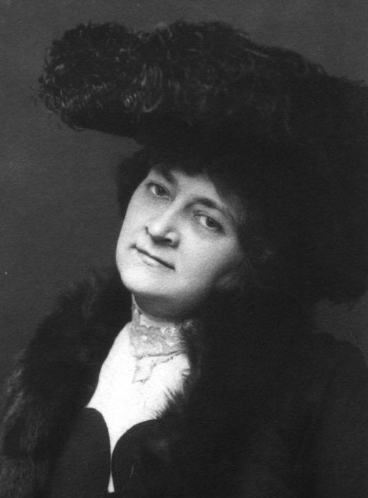
- Taken by J. C. Strauss, 1902
- Born: January 21, 1863; Murfreesboro, Tennessee, U.S.
- Died: February 6, 1935 (aged 72); Nashville, Tennessee, U.S.
- Education: Soule College; Greenwood Seminary; Cincinnati Art School; Académie Julian
- Occupation: Painter
- Spouse: J. Warren Newman (m. 1881, separated)
- Children: 1 son
- Parent(s): William Francis Betty; Sophie Rucker

Willie Betty Newman (1863-1935) was an American painter. Born on a plantation during the Civil War, she studied painting in Cincinnati, Ohio and Paris, France. She exhibited her paintings in Parisian salons in the 1890s. She established a studio in Nashville, Tennessee, in the early 1900s, where she did portraits of prominent Tennesseans, including President James K. Polk.

== Early life ==
Willie Betty was born on January 21, 1863, on Maple Grove Plantation, later known as Betty Place, in Murfreesboro, Tennessee. Her father, Colonel William Francis Betty, served in the Confederate States Army during the American Civil War of 1861–1865. Her mother, Sophie Rucker, was the daughter of Benjamine Rucker, the owner of the Maple Grove Plantation, and the owner of 200 slaves.

Betty was educated at the Soule College in Murfreesboro and the Greenwood Seminary in Lebanon, Tennessee. She attended Thomas Satterwhite Noble's Cincinnati Art School in Cincinnati, Ohio. She subsequently attended the Académie Julian in Paris, France.

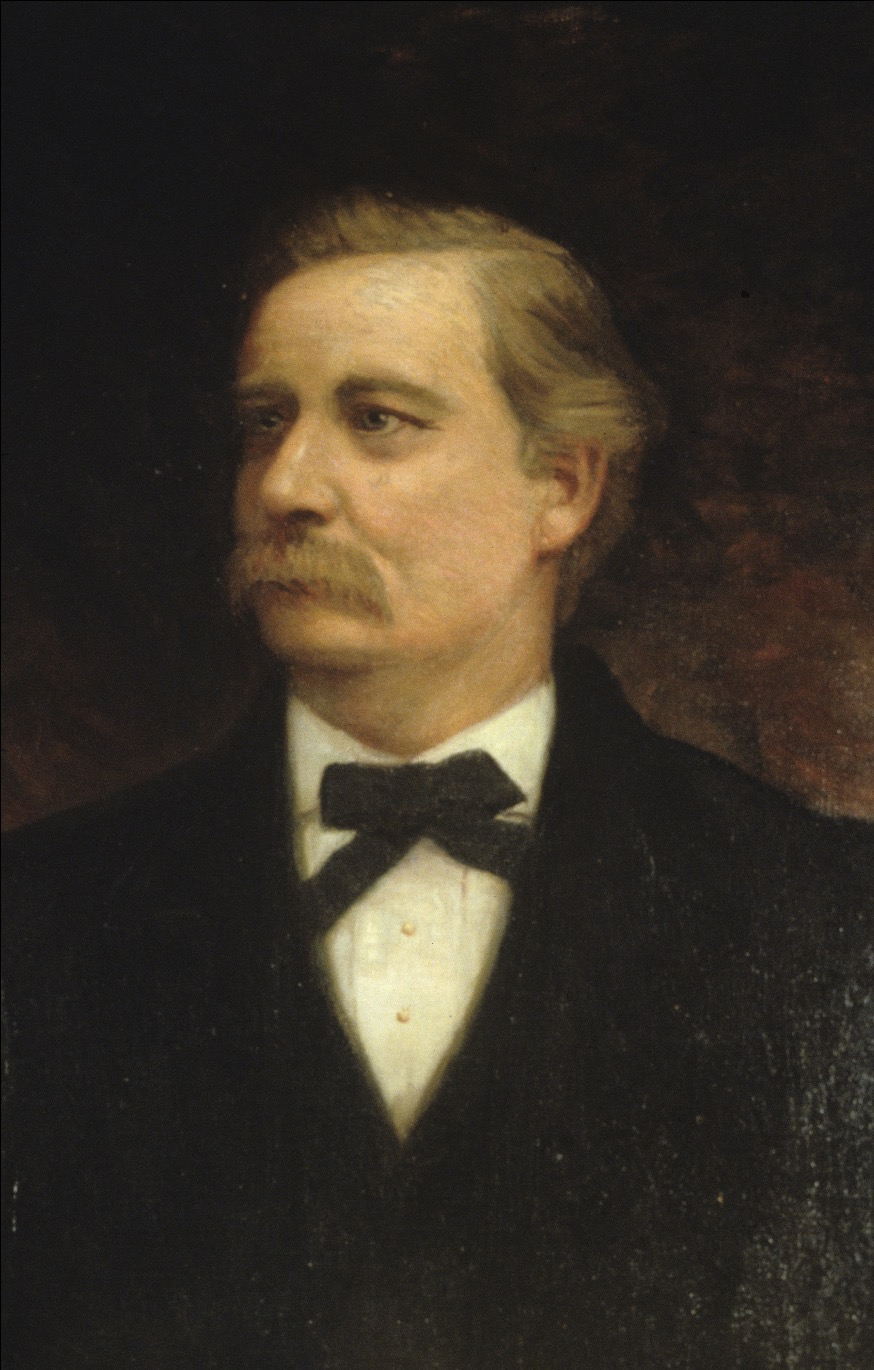
Portrait of John P. Buchanan.

== Career ==
Betty Newman exhibited her paintings in Parisian salons from 1891 to 1900.

Betty Newman became a painter in Nashville, Tennessee, in the early 1900s. She did portraits of Governor James Frazier, John Trotwood Moore, Joel Creek, Mrs. James C. Bradford, James E. Caldwell, Oscar F. Noel, and other Tennesseans. She also did portraits of James K. Polk and John C. Bell for the United States Capitol.

Betty Newman was the recipient of the Parthenon award from the Nashville Museum of Art.

== Personal life, death and legacy ==
Betty married J. Warren Newman on January 2, 1881. They separated shortly after their wedding. They had a son, William Gold Newman, who was raised by relatives. She died on February 6, 1935, in Nashville, Tennessee.

Some of her paintings are in the permanent collection of the Cheekwood Botanical Garden and Museum of Art. Moreover, three of her paintings are exhibited at The Athenaeum in Columbia, Tennessee. In 2002, an exhibition of her work was held at The Parthenon in Nashville's Centennial Park.
