= Anna Russell Cole =

American philanthropist (1846 – 1926)

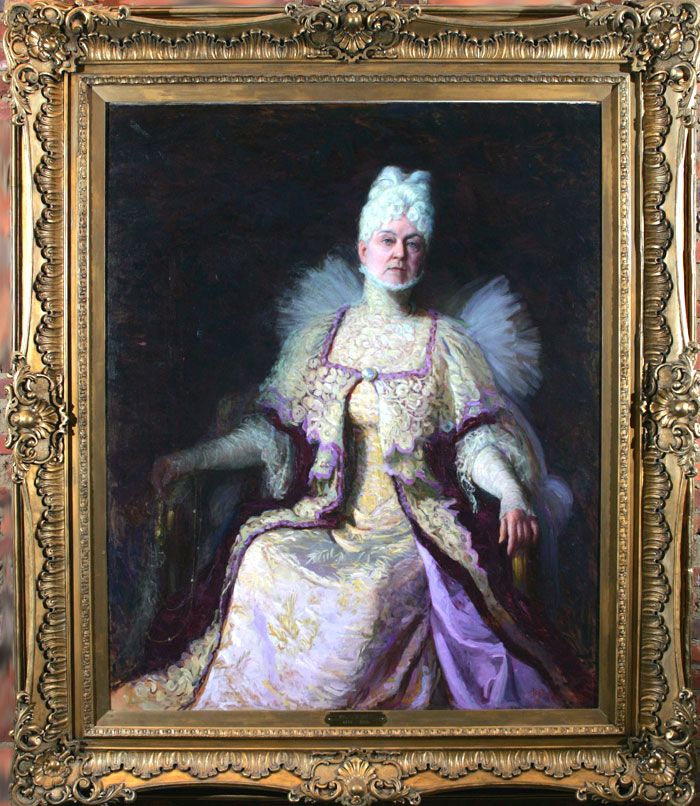
- Born: Anna Virginia Russell; January 16, 1846; Augusta, Georgia, United States
- Died: June 6, 1926 (aged 80); Nashville, Tennessee, United States
- Occupation: Philanthropist
- Spouse: Edmund William Cole (m. 1872; died 1899)
- Children: 2
- Parent: Henry F. Russell

Anna Virginia Russell Cole (January 16, 1846 – June 6, 1926) was an American philanthropist known for her contributions to education, social reform, and the arts in the late 19th and early 20th centuries. Born into a prominent family in Augusta, Georgia, Cole's life was marked by both personal tragedy and a strong commitment to social justice. She was a significant figure in the development of Vanderbilt University and a supporter of various social causes, including the Tennessee Industrial School and the Southern Sociological Conference.

== Biography ==
=== Early life ===
Anna Virginia Russell Cole was born on January 16, 1846, in Augusta, Georgia, as the eldest daughter and second of the nine children to Henry F. Russell and Martha Danforth. Her father, a successful cotton merchant and commodities speculator, was a notable figure in Augusta, serving as mayor in 1868 and 1869. The Russell family were devout Methodists and were known for their social standing and influence in the community.

Cole's childhood was marked by the loss of her brother, Whitefoord Russell, the only male among nine children. He died while fighting for the Confederacy in 1864. Cole was largely self-educated and received a limited formal education, attending Wesleyan College in Macon, Georgia, briefly in 1862. However, she did not complete her semesters.

She later spent several years in Berlin, Germany, from 1866 to 1871, where she took a course from the University of Berlin, as well as teaching there, auditing classes. She also tutored the children of her uncle, a former professor of the University of Georgia. During this time, Cole lived in the home of Leopold von Ranke, a renowned historian considered a pioneer of modern historical research. After she moved back to Augusta, she worked for a school for girls as an instructor in German and French.

=== Marriage and life in Nashville ===
In 1872, Anna Virginia Russell Cole married Edmund W. Cole, a business magnate who was nineteen years older than her, involved in the railroad industry. Edmund Cole was the president of the Nashville & Chattanooga Railroad and an officer of the Georgia Banking & Railroad Company of Augusta. The couple moved to Nashville, Tennessee where Cole took on the responsibilities of managing their household and raising their children.

Edmund Cole had seven children from a previous marriage, and the couple had two children of their own. Their first child was named after her deceased brother, Whitefoord Russell Cole, born in 1874. They had a daughter in 1889, Anna Russell.

Cole dedicated the early years of her marriage to her family and supporting her husband's business endeavors. She managed their unfinished home in Nashville and took on the role of stepmother to her husband's children. From that period, she also became involved with philanthropic activities. One of their stepsons, Randal Cole, died in 1884 in a railroad accident. Anna Cole encouraged her husband to found an education institute in his memory, The Randal Cole Institute, which was later renamed to Tennessee Industrial School.

=== Philanthropic endeavors ===
Cole and her husband were known for their significant contributions to various organizations. They were major donors to the Tennessee Industrial School, which provided education and support for orphaned and disadvantaged boys. The school was initially established in memory of their stepson, one of Edmund Cole's children from a previous marriage. Their donations to the school were amounted to US$100,000 (roughly US$2,845,588 today). Cole also supported temperance societies and Methodist missions.

Cole directed philanthropic efforts towards Vanderbilt University. Edmund Cole served on the university's Board of Trust from 1886 to 1899, and their son, Whitefoord R. Cole, later served as chairperson from 1915 to 1934. In 1894, the Coles gave the first half of a $10,000 endowment for an annual lecture series dedicated to the defense and advocacy of Christianity. They also contributed $2,500 to a scholarship fund and $5,000 to the university library, which was its sole endowment from 1905 to 1918. Shortly before her death, Anna Cole gave another $10,000 to endow the office of dean of women. In 1914, during a crucial endowment campaign, she donated $10,000 to support Chancellor James H. Kirkland's effort to assert Vanderbilt's independence from the Methodist church hierarchy.

=== Later years and legacy ===
After her husband's death in 1899, Cole continued her philanthropic work. She divided her time between her Nashville residence, called "Colemere", and homes in Wequetonsing, Michigan, and Washington, D.C. She was known for her social circle and hosted prominent figures, including Presidents Theodore Roosevelt and William Howard Taft.

Cole was a donor for the Southern Sociological Conference, a newly formed organization addressing social issues like child welfare, prison reform, public health, education, and race relations. In 1912, the Southern Sociological Conference named Cole as a founder, and she endowed the conference with $7,500.

Politically, Cole was in favor of international peace efforts, attending a conference in Vienna in 1916 and backing Woodrow Wilson's goal to have the United States join the League of Nations. In 1920, she donated $2,000 to the Democratic National Committee in 1920.

Cole had a keen interest in poetry and sponsored a memorial in Augusta honoring four Southern poets: Sidney Lanier, Father Abram Joseph Ryan, James R. Randall, and Paul Hamilton Hayne. She also supported the early work of John Crowe Ransom and Merrill Moore.

A historic building on the campus of Nashville School of the Arts in Nashville, Tennessee, U.S. was built in 1894. It was named after Anna Russell Cole in Cole's honor. She died at Colemere on June 6, 1926.

== Sources ==
=== Books ===
- Commire, Anne; Klezmer, Deborah, eds. (2007). "Cole, Anna Russell (1846–1926)". Dictionary of Women Worldwide: 25,000 Women Through the Ages. Vol. 1. Detroit, MI: Yorkin Publications. p. 413.
- Turner, William B. (February 2000). "Cole, Anna Virginia Russell". American National Biography. New York: Oxford University Press. doi:10.1093/anb/9780198606697.article.2001271. (subscription required)
- Radcliffe College (1971). James, Edward T.; James, Janet Wilson; Boyer, Paul S. (eds.). Notable American Women, 1607-1950: A Biographical Dictionary. United Kingdom: Belknap Press of Harvard University Press. pp. 358–359. ISBN 978-0-674-62734-5.
- Tinling, Marion (1986). Women Remembered: A Guide to Landmarks of Women's History in the United States. Bloomsbury Academic. ISBN 978-0-313-23984-7.
