= Jesse Ely Wills =

American poet

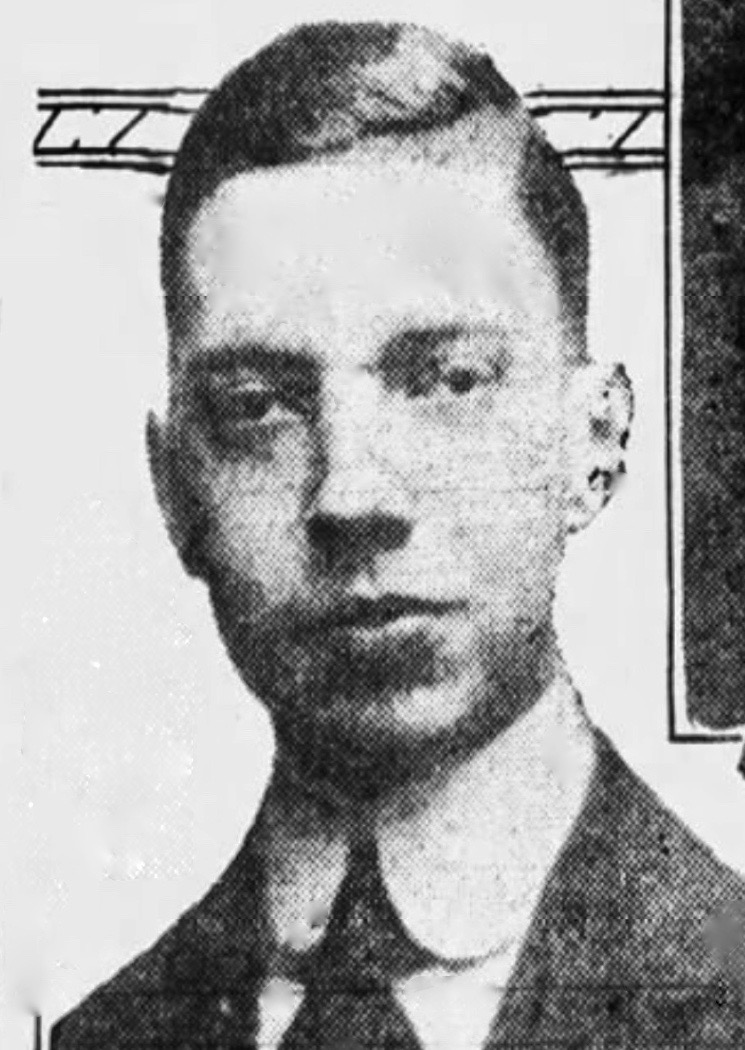
- Jesse Ely Wills (newspaper article published in May, 1923)
- Died: March 4, 1977
- Occupations: Businessman, poet
- Children: Ridley Wills II
- Parent: William Ridley Wills
- Relatives: William Ridley Wills (cousin)

Jesse Ely Wills (1899–1977) was an American businessman and poet. He was the chairman of the National Life and Accident Insurance Company and the author of four poetry collections. National Life was founded by his father, William Ridley Wills in 1902. Jesse Wills began working there at age 23 when he was a student at Vanderbilt University and remained with the company his entire career. In 1925, the company created radio station WSM to help promote their business and built a studio on the fifth floor of their building. National Life Insurance and station WSM achieved international recognition in creating the "Grand Ole Opry " which was broadcast nationwide and became the longest-running radio broadcast in U.S. history.

In 1922, while a student at Vanderbilt, Wills was a member of the "Fugitives," an influential literary movement. The Fugitives wrote and published poetry, and included notable writers Robert Penn Warren, Allen Tate, John Crowe Ransom and Donald Davidson. The group published the Fugitive Magazine between 1922 and 1925. Two of the members (Warren and Tate) later became United States Poets Laureate.

== Selected works ==
- Wills, Jesse (1973). Nashville and Other Poems. Nashville, Tennessee: Fantasie Press. OCLC 2093788.
