= Anna Russell Cole Auditorium =

- Cole, Anna Russell, Auditorium
- U.S. National Register of Historic Places
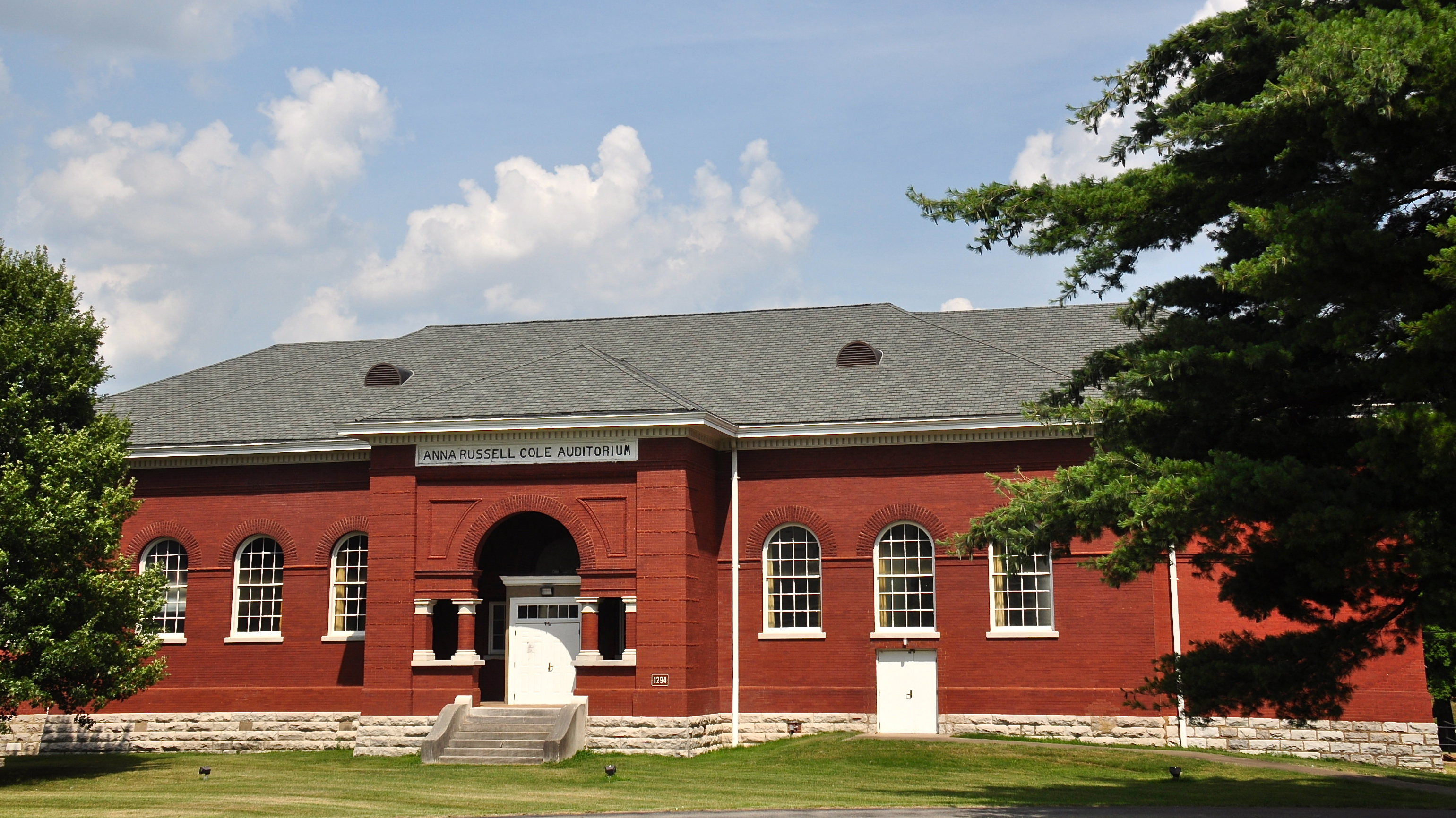
- The Anna Russell Cole Auditorium in 2014

- Location within Tennessee
- Location: Nashville School of the Arts campus, Nashville, Tennessee
- Coordinates: 36°7′56″N 86°44′28″W
- Area: less than one acre
- Built: 1894
- Architectural style: Richardson Romanesque
- NRHP reference No.: 80003788
- Added to NRHP: April 17, 1980

The Anna Russell Cole Auditorium is a historic building on the campus of Nashville School of the Arts in Nashville, Tennessee, U.S. It was built in 1894. It was named in honor of Anna Russell Cole, philanthropist and wife of Confederate colonel Edmund William Cole, who founded the Randall Cole Industrial School in 1885. It has been listed on the National Register of Historic Places since April 17, 1980. The building is not used or maintained.
