= Ellington Agricultural Center =

Agricultural center in Nashville, US

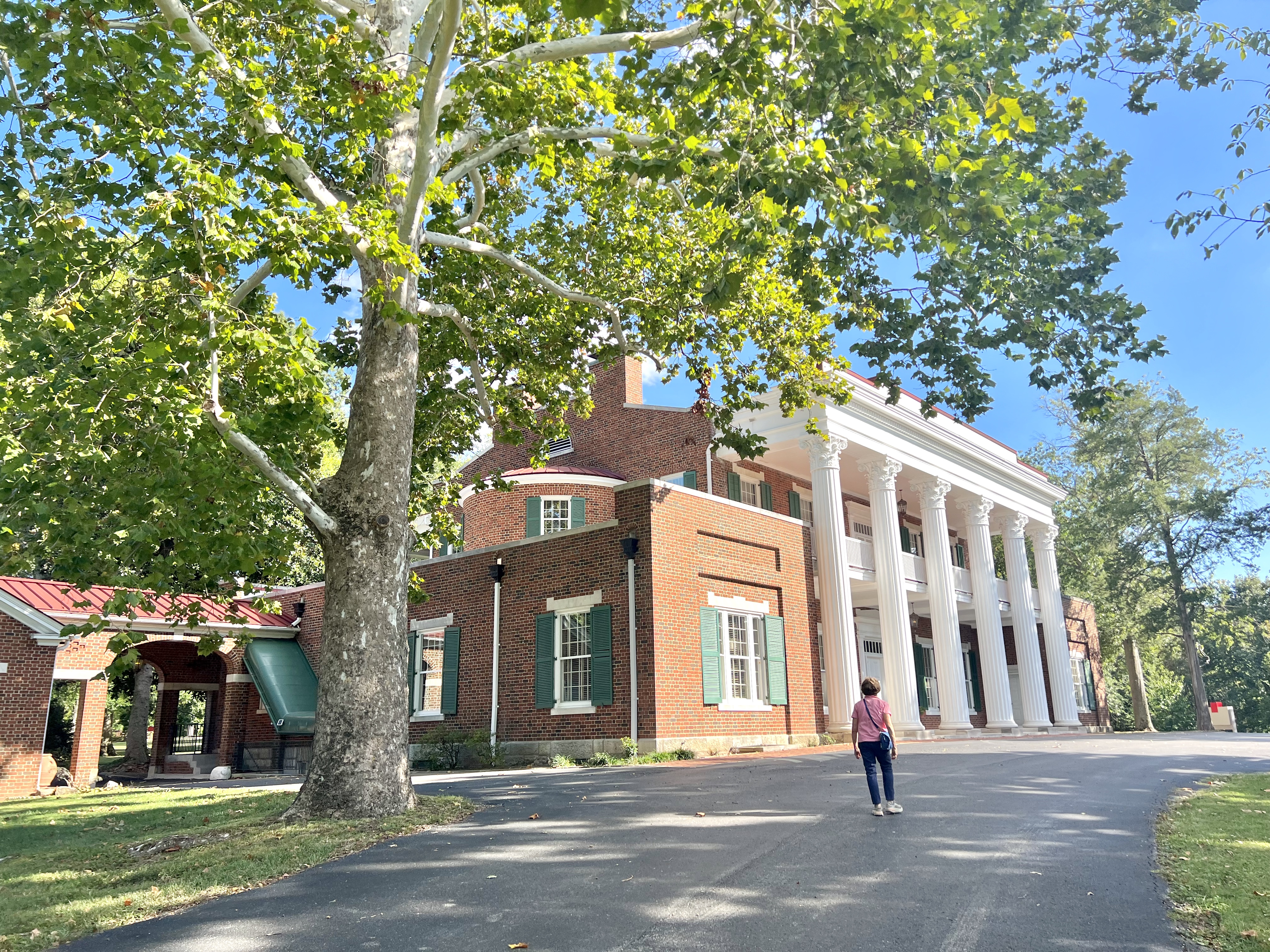
Ellington Agricultural Center, Nashville, Tennessee, 2023

The Ellington Agricultural Center is a 207 acres (84 ha) acre campus in Nashville, Tennessee, which features many structures housing the Tennessee Department of Agriculture, the Tennessee Wildlife Resources Agency, and the Tennessee Agricultural Museum as well as other state agencies related to agriculture. It is located about 10 miles south of Nashville. The site includes more than 10 buildings that are interconnected by walking trails.

== History ==
The 207 acres of land belonged to the Ewing family since the 1800s. In the 1910s, Brentwood Hall was built for Rogers Caldwell, a prominent businessman across the Southern United States. When he was convicted of fraud, his estate was seized by the state of Tennessee and turned into this center. It was named after Buford Ellington, who served as Governor of Tennessee from 1959 to 1963 and again from 1967 to 1971.

The center is home to the headquarters of the Tennessee Department of Agriculture, the Tennessee Wildlife Resources Agency, and the Tennessee Agricultural Museum. It has a long frontage along Sevenmile Creek, an arboretum, an iris garden, and a hiking trail known as The Rogers Trail. It hosts the Annual Rural Life Festival, organized by the Tennessee Agricultural Museum. It also serves as a wedding venue.
