= William Ridley Wills (insurance executive) =

American insurance executive (1871–1949)

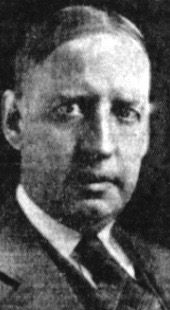
- William Ridley Wills in 1925
- Born: September 19, 1871; Brownsville, Tennessee, US
- Died: November 21, 1949 (aged 78); Nashville, Tennessee, US
- Occupation: Businessman
- Spouse: Jessie Ely
- Children: Jesse Ely Wills and Mamie Craig Wills
- Relatives: William Ridley Wills (nephew); William Ridley Wills II (grandson)

William Ridley Wills (September 19, 1871 – November 21, 1949) was an American insurance executive. He was the founder of the National Life and Accident Insurance Company in Nashville in 1902.

Wills came to Nashville in 1893 to serve as Tennessee's deputy commissioner of insurance. There he met C.A. Craig and C. Runcie Clements and the three men formed the National Life and Accident Company after purchasing another insurance company which was being sold at auction. The new company sold health and accident insurance policies to industrial workers, a large percentage of whom were African-American. The company grew and moved into a large stone building in downtown Nashville where, in 1925, it launched radio station WSM which won international fame in creating the broadcast the "Grand Ole Opry". Wills died of a stroke in 1949. His nephew (identically named) was poet and novelist William Ridley Wills, and his grandson is author and historian William Ridley Wills II.

== Biography ==
Wills was born on September 19, 1871, in Brownsville, Tennessee. His parents were Haywood County pioneers. His father was surgeon William Thaddeus Wills, who served under the command of Nathan Bedford Forest in the Civil War. Wills' mother was Elizabeth Mann. In 1898, Wills married Jessie Ely of Nashville, the daughter of Jessie and Ruth Whiteside Ely. The Nashville Banner said the wedding "united two very old families of Tennessee and was the social event of the week". The newlyweds lived at the Maney residence on Hays St. in Nashville, and later on Belle Meade Boulevard in Belle Meade, Tennessee. They had two children, Jessie Ely Wills, and Mamie Craig Wills. In 1930, after becoming successful in the insurance industry, Wills donated a fully-equipped 32 bed hospital to the City of Brownsville as a memorial to his father. He died on November 21, 1949, aged 78, in Nashville, Tennessee. His wife died in 1965, at age 92.

== National Life and Accident Insurance ==
In 1901, Wills, along with C.A. Craig and C.R. Clements purchased another insurance company, the "National Sick and Accident Company" on Nashville's courthouse steps at auction for $17,250. They formed a new company called the National Life and Accident Insurance Company. Typical early products of the newly formed company included a policy that sold for 5 cents a week to pay the holder $1.25 per week in case of illness. Customers were mostly industrial workers, including many African-Americans. The company prospered and extended its services and staff. In 1924, it moved into a multi-story building at Seventh and Union in Nashville. In 1925, the company entered the radio broadcasting business and established station WSM on the fifth floor of their building. They were responsible for the "Grand Ole Opry" show featuring county music, taking advantage of a powerful clear-channel broadcast that reached much of the US. The program became the longest-running radio broadcast in US history.

== Tennessee Governor's residence ==
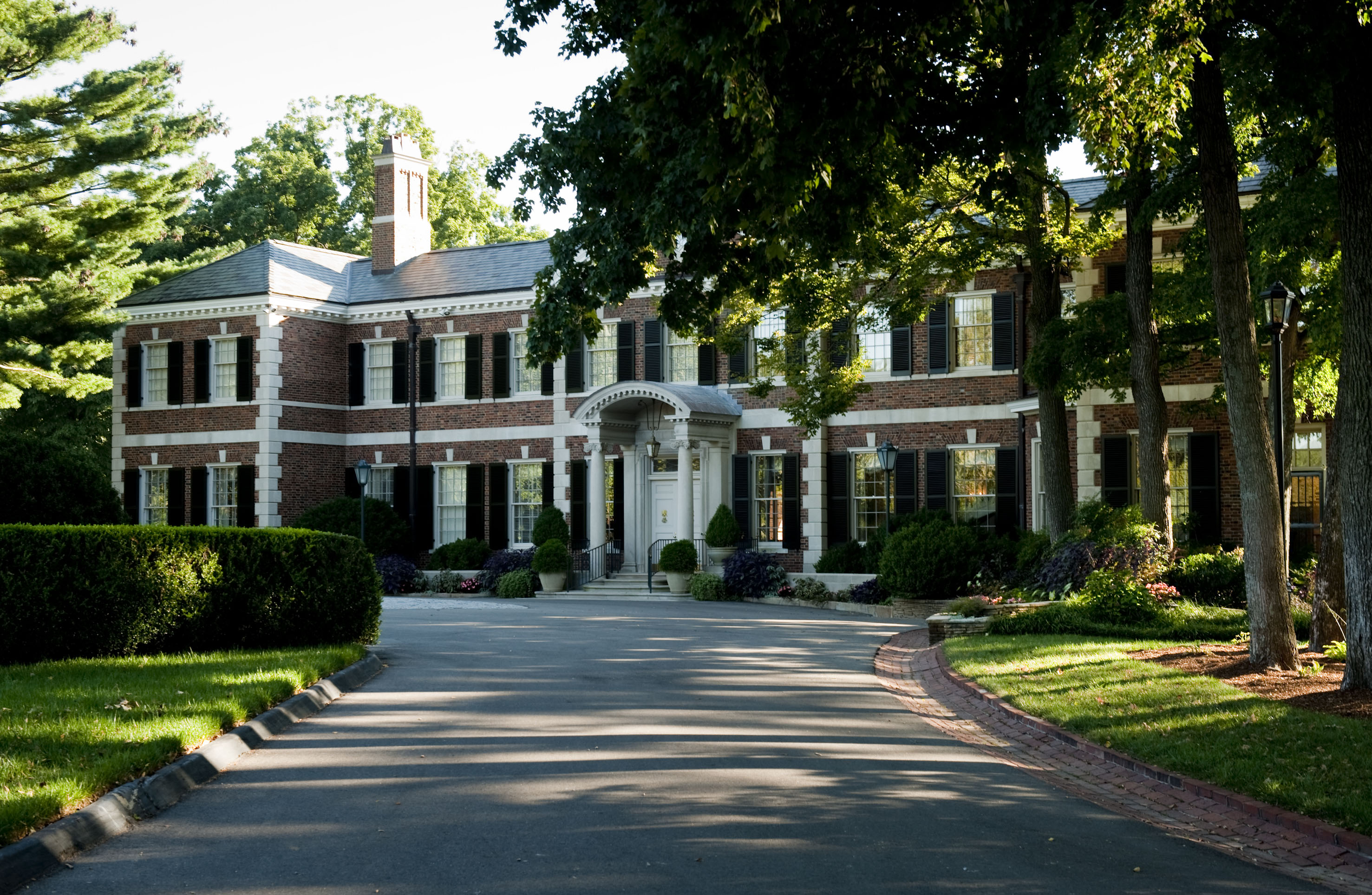
Tennessee Governor's Mansion in 2013

Wills built a three-story Georgian-style home on a ten acres (4.0 hectares) site in Nashville in 1931. He called the house "Far Hills" for its beautiful views. After his death in 1949 the State of Tennessee purchased the home and has since used it as the Governor's residence. In 2003 a major renovation created a 14,000 square foot (1,300 m^{2}) underground meeting and banquet facility at the site.
