= Benjamine Rucker House =

Historic house in Tennessee, United States

- U.S. National Register of Historic Places
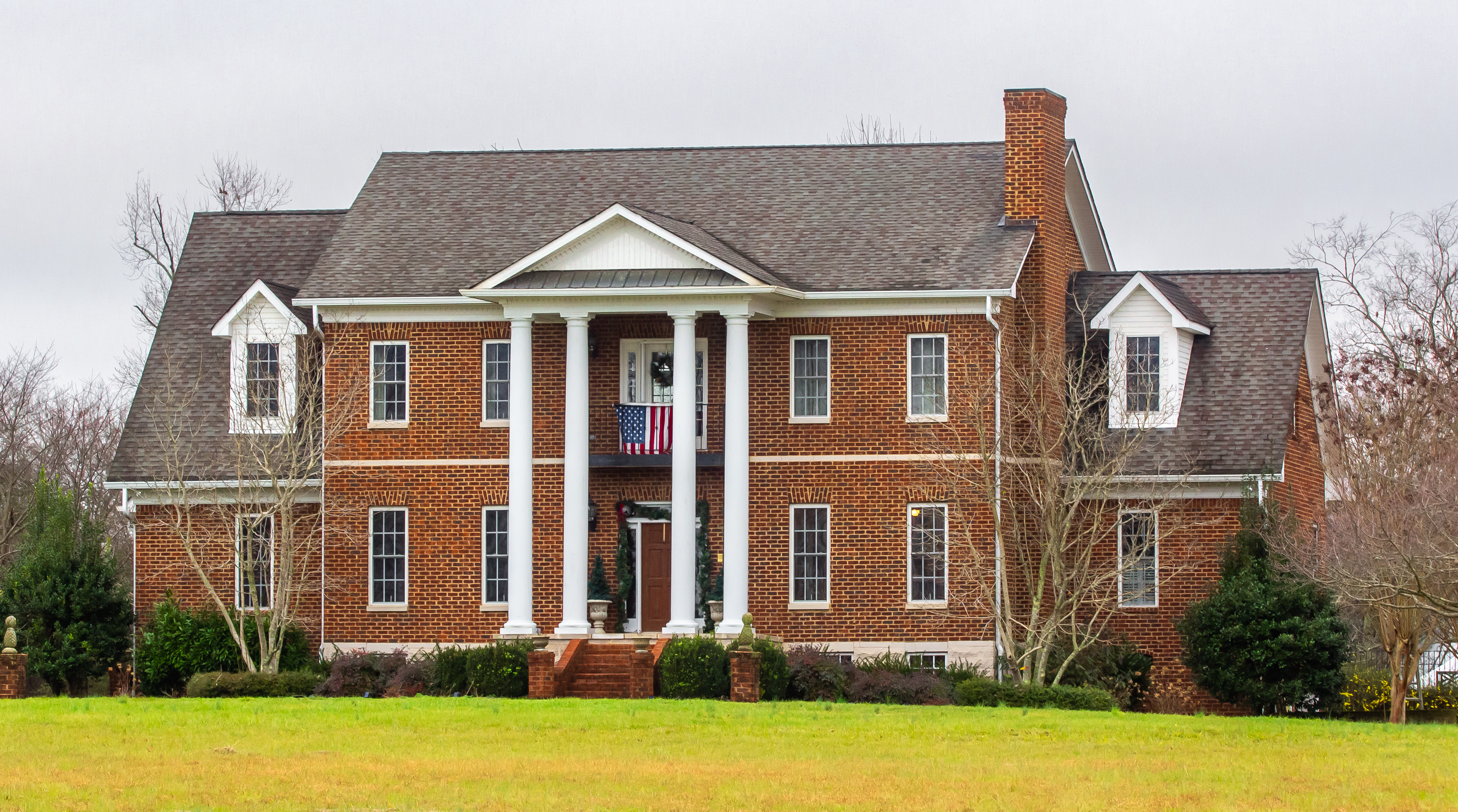

- Location within Tennessee
- Nearest city: Compton, Tennessee
- Coordinates: 35°55′14″N 86°19′51″W
- Area: 3.5 acres (1.4 ha)
- Built: 1832
- Architectural style: Greek Revival, I-house
- NRHP reference No.: 91000223
- Added to NRHP: February 28, 1991

The Benjamine Rucker House is a historic mansion in Rutherford County, Tennessee, U.S..

== History ==
The house was built in 1832 for Benjamine Rucker, who inherited 300 acres from his father, settler James Rucker. Rucker was the owner of 200 slaves. During the American Civil War of 1861–1865, the house was ransacked by the Union Army. After the war, it was inherited by his daughter Sophie and her husband, Colonel William Francis Betty. Their daughter, Willie Betty Newman, became a painter in Paris and Nashville.

The house has been listed on the National Register of Historic Places since February 28, 1991.
