= Whitefoord Russell Cole =

American businessman (1874–1934)

Whiteford Russell Cole
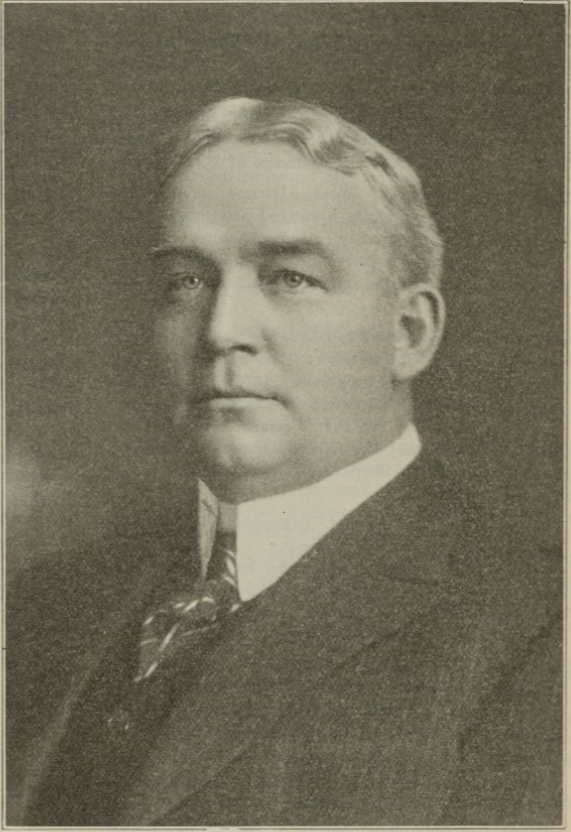
- Cole, c. 1922
- Born: January 14, 1874; Nashville, Tennessee, U.S.
- Died: November 17, 1934 (aged 60); Cave City, Kentucky, U.S.
- Resting place: Nashville, Tennessee, U.S.
- Education: Wallace University Prep School
- Alma mater: Vanderbilt University
- Occupation: Businessman
- Spouse: Mary Conner Bass
- Children: 1
- Parent(s): Edmund William Cole; Anna Russell
- Relatives: John Trotwood Moore (daughter-in-law's father)

Whiteford Russell Cole (January 14, 1874 – November 17, 1934) was an American businessman. He was the president of the Louisville and Nashville Railroad from 1926 to 1934, and a director of many companies. During the railroad strike actions of 1921–1922, he threatened his workers with dismissal and loss of pensions. His mansion in Louisville, Kentucky, is the official residence of the president of the University of Louisville.

== Early life ==
Whiteford Russell Cole was born on January 14, 1874, in Nashville, Tennessee. His father, Edmund William Cole, was a Confederate veteran and railroad executive; his mother, Anna Russell, was a philanthropist. His maternal uncle, Whitefoord Russell, was a Confederate veteran, and his maternal great-uncle was a professor at the University of Georgia and Berlin University. Cole grew up at Colemere, a mansion in Nashville, with three half-siblings from his father's first marriage to a member of the McGavock family; his parents entertained often.

Cole was educated at the Wallace University Prep School. He graduated from Vanderbilt University in 1894.

== Career ==
Cole was appointed as a director of the Nashville, Chattanooga and St. Louis Railway at the age of 26, in 1900. He had become its chairman by the outset of World War I, and he was appointed as its president in 1918. In 1919, he opposed Director General of Railroads William Gibbs McAdoo's proposal to nationalize railroads for five years, arguing that "debts would pile so high that it would be physically impossible for the roads to ever again revert to private ownership". In 1921–1922, when his railroad workers went on strike after their wages were lowered by 12 percent by the U.S. Railway Labor Board, Cole threatened them with dismissal and loss of their pensions. In retaliation, strikers went to his house on West End Avenue, and they "bombarded [it] with bottles until its concrete porch was littered with glass". In 1923, Cole dedicated the Whitefoord Cole Park in Murfreesboro, Tennessee, for use by residents even though it belonged to the company. Cole resigned in 1926.

Cole was the president of the Louisville and Nashville Railroad from 1926 to 1934. At the time of his appointment, B. C. Forbes, the founder of Forbes magazine, noted that it was unusual for a man of privileged upbringing to become the president of a railroad company. As it was the Great Depression, Cole lowered his workers' wages and took a pay cut.

Cole was the president and general manager of the Napier Iron Works and vice president of the First Savings Bank & Trust Company and the Bransford Realty Company. He also served on the boards of directors of First and Fourth National Bank, Nashville Trust Company, the Western Railway of Alabama, the Monon Railroad, the Southern Bell Telephone & Telegraph Company, the American Nashville Bank of Nashville, American Cyanamid, Fruit Growers Express and Fidelity & Columbia Trust Company. He was a member of the Association of American Railroads.

Cole was a significant real estate investor in Sheffield, Alabama.

== Civic activities and politics ==
Cole served on the board of trustees of the Brookings Institution. He served on the board of trustees of the Tennessee Industrial School, founded by his father, and the University School of Nashville. He was also the chairman of the board of trust of his alma mater, Vanderbilt University, from 1915 to 1934. He supported chancellor James Hampton Kirkland's decision to split with the Methodist Church. He served on the board of missions of the Methodist Episcopal Church, South until he joined the Episcopal Church, possibly as a return of the split.

Cole was a Democrat. According to The Tennessean, he was opposed to "any move that made for a greater centralization of governmental power than was necessary to perform its proper functions". He was a critic of laissez-faire capitalism as well as communism.

== Personal life, death and legacy ==
Cole married Mary Conner Bass, a direct descendant of Felix Grundy, in 1901. They had a son, Whitefoord Russell Cole Jr., who married Helen Lane Moore, the daughter of State Historian and Archivist John Trotwood Moore and sister of poet Merrill Moore. They resided at 2122 West End Avenue, which was later repurposed as the Nashville Conservatory of Music. In 1926, they moved to 2515 Longest Avenue in Louisville, Kentucky (now known as Amelia Place, the official resident of the president of the University of Louisville). Cole was a member of the Nashville Golf and Country Club, the Pendennis Club, the Louisville Country Club, and the Salmagundi Club.

Cole died of heart disease on November 17, 1934, on a train in Cave City, Kentucky. He was 60 years old. His funeral was held at the Christ Church Cathedral, and he was buried in Nashville. By the time of his death, he was worth an estimated $600,000. His estate was split between his wife and his son (whose trust fund would become available at age 30). Cole also bequeathed money to the Christ Church cathedrals in Nashville and Louisville.

Cole Hall, a building on the Vanderbilt campus completed in 1949, was named in his honor. Additionally, his portrait hangs in Kirkland Hall, the administration building; it was donated by his son in 1958.
