= Vernon K. Stevenson =

American businessman (1812–1884)

- Born: January 22, 1812; Russellville, Kentucky, U.S.
- Died: October 16, 1884 (aged 72); New York City, U.S.
- Resting place: Mount Olivet Cemetery
- Occupation: Businessman
- Children: 4 sons and 1 daughter
- Military career
- Allegiance: Confederate States of America (1861–1865)
- Branch: Confederate States Army; United States Army
- Service years: 1861–1862
- Rank: Quartermaster (CSA)

Vernon K. Stevenson (January 22, 1812 - October 16, 1884) was an American businessman. He served as the president of the Nashville and Chattanooga Railway for 25 years, and as the president of the Southern Pacific Railroad. He was a real estate investor in Manhattan, New York City.

== Early life ==
Stevenson was born on January 22, 1812, in Russellville, Kentucky. He had three brothers, Maxwell, Volney and Leander Douglas. His sisters were Eleanor (m. Godfrey M. Fogg) Julia Emily (m. Dr. John Arnold Crowdus, Lemuel Swearengin), and Harriet J. (m. Patrick Boisseau) He moved to Nashville, Tennessee, in 1831. Stevenson's mother Eleanor Sharp was the sister of Congressman and Kentucky Attorney General and State Legislator Solomon Porcius Sharp was assassinated in 1835 in what became known as The Kentucky Tragedy.

== Career ==
Stevenson began his career as a clerk in a dry goods store in Nashville. He later became head manager, and he invested in a store with his brother Volney.

Stevenson was the founder of the Nashville and Chattanooga Railway in 1848. To fundraise for its construction, Stevenson sold stocks to investors in Nashville and Charleston, South Carolina. Stevenson built the railroad with iron-rails from London thanks to George Peabody. It was completed in 1854, and Stevenson served as its president. He hired Edmund William Cole as superintendent in 1857, and Stevenson became "a kind of co-president, or president ex officio."

Stevenson was elected as the "president" of the board of directors of the Winchester and Alabama Railroad in Winchester, Tennessee, in 1857.

In 1861, at the outset of the American Civil War of 1861–1865, Stevenson was appointed as the quartermaster for the Confederate States Army by General Albert Sidney Johnston. Shortly after the evacuation of Nashville in February 1862, he moved to Murfreesboro, where he managed a portion of the tracks. However, the vast majority of the railroad was taken over by the Union Army. Stevenson sold the railroad to August Belmont in 1880, and it merged with the Louisville and Nashville Railroad.

After the war, Stevenson moved to New York City and invested in real estate in uptown Manhattan. He was the owner of 44 Broadway, rented by the Standard Oil Company.

== Personal life, death and legacy ==
Stevenson's first wife was Maria L. Bass and they had one son Hugh Stevenson. His second wife was Elizabeth (Bessie) they had one son, Vernon King Stevenson Jr. Elizabeth was the daughter of John Childress who owned a farm near the modern-day campus of Vanderbilt University. His third wife was the daughter of surgeon Paul F. Eve. Stevenson had two sons and one daughter with her, Paul Eve Stevenson, Maxwell Stevenson, and Eloise Stevenson.

Stevenson resided at 59th Street and 10th Avenue in Manhattan, New York City, and he was a member of the Manhattan Club. He was worth $5 million by 1884.

Stevenson was a donor to the Democratic Party. He supported Andrew Jackson and Stephen A. Douglas, and he was friends with James K. Polk and John C. Calhoun.

Stevenson died on October 16, 1884, in New York City. He was buried in Mount Olivet Cemetery in Nashville. His tomb was designed as "an exact replica of Napoleon's tomb in Paris."

Stevenson, Alabama was named in his honor.
