= Sidney Mttron Hirsch =

American dramatist

- Born: January 3, 1884; Nashville, Tennessee, U.S.
- Died: April 7, 1962 (aged 78); Nashville, Tennessee, U.S.
- Occupations: Model, playwright

Sidney Mttron Hirsch (January 3, 1884 – April 7, 1962) was an American model and playwright. He was a model for sculptors Auguste Rodin and Gertrude Vanderbilt Whitney. He was a member of The Fugitives.

== Early life ==
Sidney Mttron Hirsch was born on January 3, 1884, in Nashville, Tennessee. His father was a wealthy merchant. He was raised as an Orthodox Jew.

Hirsch was educated in public schools in Nashville and attended Joseph W. Allen College in Carthage, Tennessee. He did not graduate from college. However, his half-sister Rose "Goldie" Hirsch married James Marshall Frank, a Professor of English at Vanderbilt University. Through his brother-in-law, he became acquainted with The Fugitives.

Hirsch joined the United States Navy and served in the Philippines and China for two years. While in the Far East, he took up boxing and studied many forms of mysticism and esoterism, including Kabbalah (where his middle name came from Metatron), rosicrucianism, numerology, astrology and etymology. Once off duty, he traveled in Korea and India.

== Career ==
Hirsch returned to Nashville but soon moved to Paris, France, where he became a model for the sculptor Auguste Rodin. He was introduced to Gertrude Stein and George William Russell, who encouraged him to look at the double meanings of words in literary texts. Meanwhile, he learned to read Latin, Ancient Greek and Hebrew. Additionally, he learned some "Babylonian, Syrian, Chaldean, Arabic, Sanskrit, and ancient Egyptian."

Hirsch moved to New York City, where he modeled for sculptor Gertrude Vanderbilt Whitney. Additionally, Hirsch published short stories and art criticism in literary reviews. He wrote his first play, Potiphar's Wife, based on Potiphar. The play was never performed in New York due to differences between Hirsch and the producers. In April 1912, Hirsch visited Nashville briefly to give a lecture on the Trinity in art at the chapel of the Ward Seminary (now Belmont University).

Hirsch returned permanently to Nashville, where he became a playwright and a member of The Fugitives. The group met at his sister's house near the Vanderbilt University campus, where Hirsch lived. Hirsch was elected their first president in 1923. As such, he was the one who started each meeting.

Hirsch published The Fire Regained, a play about Greek mythology, in February 1912. It was performed at the May Festival of 1913 organized by the Nashville Art Association, outside The Parthenon in Centennial Park. Meanwhile, the play attracted nationwide attention, from as far as Washington, D.C. and Santa Cruz, California. The play was so successful that the United States Department of State considered organizing a performance at the Acropolis of Athens in Greece. However, the plan was abandoned in the wake of World War I.

Hirsch published The Mysteries of Thanatos in 1914, but the play was unsuccessful. His next play, The Passion of Washington Square, received good reviews. It was performed in New York City and Chicago in 1915. Meanwhile, Hirsch was asked to write a vaudeville sketch for actress Phyllis Neilson-Terry.

== Death and legacy ==
Hirsch died on April 7, 1962, in Nashville, Tennessee. A nude sculpture of Hirsch, designed by African-American sculptor William Edmondson, is in the collection of the Cheekwood Botanical Garden and Museum of Art.
