= William Ridley Wills =

American poet (1897–1957)

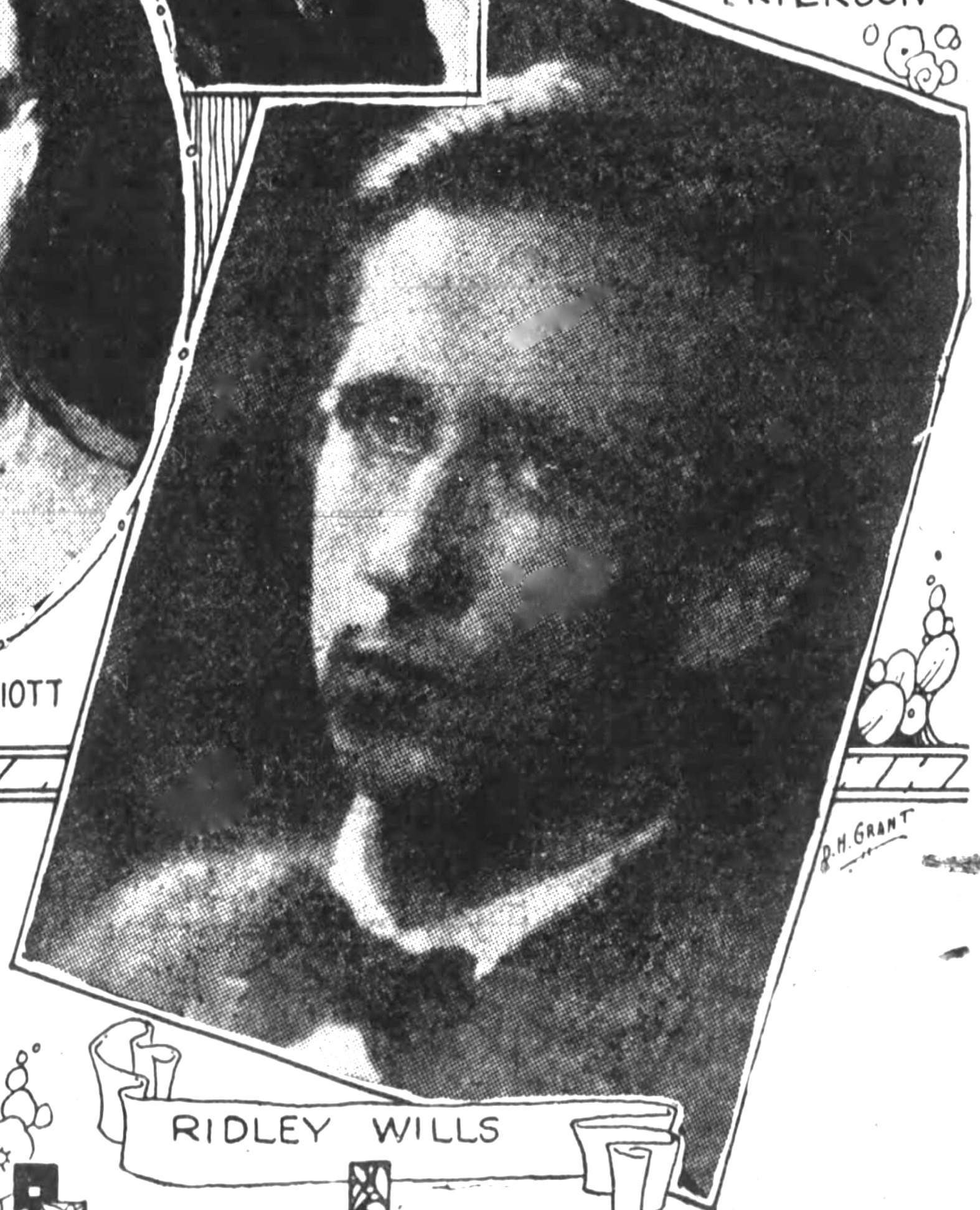
William Ridley Wills c. 1923

William Ridley Wills (March 4, 1897 – September 8, 1957) was an American novelist, poet, and journalist. Born in Brownsville, Tennessee, he was a graduate of Vanderbilt University and a member of the "Fugitives" a literary movement of the 1920s. He worked for the Memphis Press, The Commercial Appeal, and the Nashville Banner newspapers before leaving for New York to become the Sunday Editor for the New York World. He served as a 2nd Lieutenant with the U.S. Army, 76th Field Artillery during World War I and saw action at the Somme, St. Michel, and Meuse-Argonne, France. He was honorably discharged in France on July 12, 1919.

Wills wrote two novels; Hoax (1922), the life of a young man from the age of eighteen to twenty-seven, and Harvey Landrum (1924), a psychological study of chinless Harvey Landrum, who tries to conceal a sense of inferiority behind a false front of bravery, are written in a frank but restrained prose style. He and Allen Tate co-wrote a book of poetry called "The Golden Mean; and other poems" which was published in 1923.

== Background ==
His father was Asa Mann Wills, who gave his son the identical name of the son's uncle, William Ridley Wills, who was one of the founders of the National Life and Accident Insurance Company in Nashville in 1902. His mother was Della Belle Womack. While a student at Vanderbilt University, Wills and his younger cousin Jesse Ely Wills (father of Ridley Wills II) were both members of the Fugitives literary movement. After the returning from France, William Ridley Wills married Louella Wilson and they had 5 children: Andrew, William, David, Louella, and Thaddeus. They divorced in 1942 in Duval, Florida.

He spent the last four years of his life as a patient at the Bay Pines Veterans Hospital in Florida where he also served as the editor of the hospital newspaper. He died on September 8, 1957.

== Allen Tate's view of Wills ==
Allen Tate wrote of Wills in the book "The Golden Mean":

"Ridley Wills came into the crass universe like a Spring wind with a napkin under its chin. He has subsequently attended many banquets and stol'n the scraps. We shall be somewhat glad for Ridley reaches into the very cul-de-sac of human passion; in fact, he reaches into human passion.

Ridley Wills' genius is uncontested; he doesn't even contest it himself. His mind is immediate; it has no middle term. His intuition of reality points only to foreknowledge, and that, perhaps, is why he knows practically nothing of the past. Ridley Wills is quite at his ease in the novel. I think that Ridley has a very bright future behind him, because he is more than successful in his collaboration with me. He permanence is established-he is certainly the most parabolic young man of the Younger Generation."
