= John Trotwood Moore =

American journalist and writer (1858–1929)

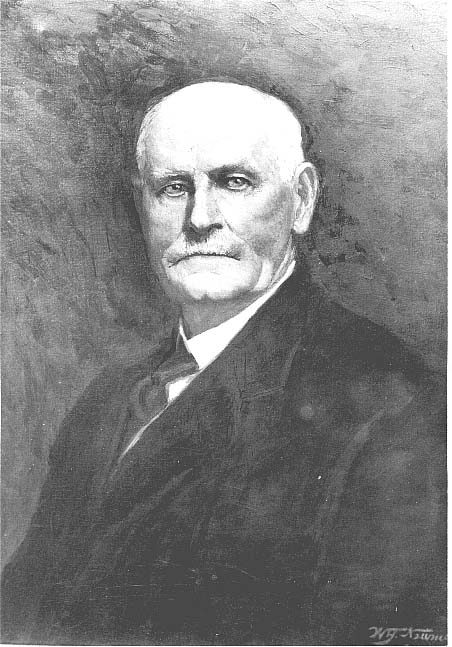
- Born: John Moore, Jr. August 26, 1858; Marion, Alabama, U.S.
- Died: May 10, 1929 (aged 70); Nashville, Tennessee, U.S.
- Resting place: Mount Olivet Cemetery
- Education: Howard College
- Occupations: Journalist; historian; novelist
- Spouses: Florence W. Allen; Mary Brown Daniel
- Children: 1 son (Merrill Moore), 2 daughters
- Parent(s): John Moore; Emily Moore
- Relatives: Whitefoord Russell Cole (son-in-law's father)

John Trotwood Moore (August 26, 1858 – May 10, 1929) was an American journalist, writer and local historian. He was the author of many poems, short stories and novels. He served as the State Librarian and Archivist of Tennessee from 1919 to 1929. He created Moore Academy in Pine Apple, Alabama in 1883. He was "an apologist for the Old South", and a proponent of lynching.

== Early life ==
John Moore Jr., was born on August 26, 1858, in Marion, Alabama. He was of Scotch-Irish descent. His father, John Moore, was a lawyer and Confederate veteran. His mother was named Emily. He had a sister, who later married a professor at Vanderbilt University.

In 1878, Moore graduated with an A.B. degree from Howard College, now known as Samford University, where he studied the classics, and was a member of the Sigma Chi fraternity. While in college, he wrote The Howard College Magazine. Later, he read law with Hilary A. Herbert.

== Career ==
Moore started his career as a journalist for The Marion Commonwealth, a newspaper in Marion, Alabama. He was a schoolteacher in Monterey, Butler County, Alabama, and a school principal in Pine Apple, Alabama, in the early 1880s.

Moore became a columnist for Clark's Horse Review in 1885. He took the penname of "Trotwood" after Betsey Trotwood, a character in Charles Dickens's David Copperfield. His column, called "Pacing Department", included short stories, poems and local histories. In 1897, Moore decided to publish a collection of his columns, entitled Songs and Stories from Tennessee. Four years later, in 1901, he published his first novel A Summer Hymnal. Over the years, Moore published several other novels.

Moore founded Trotwood's Monthly, an agrarian magazine, in 1905. A year later, as it merged with Robert Love Taylor's magazine, it became known as the Taylor-Trotwood Magazine. Moore was the chief writer and editor. The magazine was discontinued in 1910. Meanwhile, he was the author of historical sketches on Andrew Jackson, Andrew Johnson, James K. Polk and Sam Houston. He was also a contributor to The Saturday Evening Post.

Moore was "an apologist for the Old South." Labeled a "local colorist", Moore's fiction typically included African Americans, horses, Native Americans, bluegrass, and Tennessee culture. The main repeating character in his stories, Old Wash, was compared to the Uncle Remus character created by his contemporary, Joel Chandler Harris. Moore was contemptuous of low-class whites and criticized Thomas Dixon for writing sensationalist novels.

Moore was openly racist. His racist ideas were reinforced by his reading Joseph Widney's 1907 Race Life of the Aryan Peoples, a book recommended to him by Theodore Roosevelt, which Moore proceeded to review favorably. He was a defender of the Ku Klux Klan and a proponent of lynching. Additionally, Moore was francophobic for racist reasons, lambasting the French for "intermarrying with the Indians and treating them as equals" during the French colonization of the Americas.

Moore was appointed as the State Librarian and Archivist for Tennessee by Governor Albert H. Roberts in March 1919. He was recommended by businessman James Erwin Caldwell. He served in this capacity until 1929. He was invited to give a speech at the dedication of a bronze plaque in honor of President Jefferson Davis at St. John's Episcopal Church in Montgomery, Alabama, in May 1925.

== Personal life ==
Moore married Florence W. Allen in February 1885. They resided in Columbia, Tennessee, where they raised Tennessee Pacers on their farm. After his first wife died in 1896, Moore married Mary Brown Daniel on June 13, 1900. They had a son, and two daughters. They resided in South Nashville, Tennessee, where they organized possum hunts and literary gatherings.

Moore was Presbyterian.

== Death and legacy ==
Moore died on May 10, 1929, in Nashville. The governor of Tennessee ordered state offices closed and flags to fly at half-mast. He was also one of the honorary pallbearers, along with four past governors. The actual pallbearers were African Americans clad in Confederate grey. He was buried at the Mount Olivet Cemetery.

After his death, his widow was appointed State Librarian and Archivist for Tennessee. She served in this capacity until 1949. Meanwhile, their son, Merrill Moore, became a poet and member of a circle of writers known as "The Fugitives", who were partly inspired by Moore's own writing. One of his daughters, Helen Lane Moore, married Whitefoord Russell Cole Jr., the son of railroad executive Whitefoord Russell Cole.

In 2019, the plaque that Moore dedicated to Jefferson Davis at a church in 1925 was moved to the church's archives. The pastor cited Moore's involvement as one of the reasons for the removal.

== Bibliography ==
- Moore, John Trotwood (1897). Songs and Stories from Tennessee. Chicago: J.C. Bauer. OCLC 7537055.
- Moore, John Trotwood (1901). A Summer Hymnal: A Romance of Tennessee. Philadelphia: H.T. Coates & Co. OCLC 1543424.
- Moore, John Trotwood (1906). The Bishop of Cottontown: A Story of the Southern Cotton Mills. Philadelphia: J.C. Winston Co. OCLC 2175994.
- Moore, John Trotwood (1910). Uncle Wash: His Story. Philadelphia: John C. Winston Co. OCLC 2043887.
- Moore, John Trotwood (1911). The Gift of the Grass: Being the Autobiography of a Famous Racing Horse. Boston: Little, Brown, and Co. OCLC 5433142.
- Moore, John Trotwood (1925). Ole Mistis, and Other Songs and Stories from Tennessee. Nashville, Tennessee: Cokesbury Press. OCLC 1524848.
- Moore, John Trotwood (1925). Jack Ballington, Forester. Nashville, Tennessee: Cokesbury Press. OCLC 4585276.
- Moore, John Trotwood (1926). Hearts of Hickory: A Story of Andrew Jackson and the War of 1812. Nashville, Tennessee: Cokesbury Press. OCLC 1178990.
- Moore, John Trotwood (1926). Tom's Last Forage. Nashville, Tennessee: Cokesbury Press. OCLC 7865046.
