= Jesse Stuart =

American poet

Jesse Hilton Stuart
- Born: Jesse Hilton Stuart; August 8, 1906; Riverton, Kentucky, United States
- Died: February 17, 1984 (aged 77); Ironton, Ohio, US
- Education: Lincoln Memorial University Vanderbilt University
- Occupations: Author, educator
- Spouse: Naomi Deane Norris
- Children: Jessica Jane.
- Relatives: Mitchell Stuart (father); Martha Stuart (mother)
- Writing career
- Notable work: Taps for Private Tussie
- Notable awards: Guggenheim Award, 1937; Thomas Jefferson Memorial Award, 1943; Poet Laureate of Kentucky, 1954
- Website: www.jsfbooks.com

Jesse Hilton Stuart (August 8, 1906 – February 17, 1984) was an American writer, school teacher, and school administrator who is known for his short stories, poetry, and novels as well as non-fiction autobiographical works set in central Appalachia. Born and raised in Greenup County, Kentucky, Stuart relied heavily on the rural locale of northeastern Kentucky for his writings. Stuart was named the poet laureate of Kentucky in 1954.

== Early life ==
Jesse Stuart was born near Riverton, Greenup County, Kentucky, to Mitchell and Martha (Hilton) Stuart on August 8, 1906. Stuart served in the US Navy during World War II but did not see combat as his mission in his life.

== Naomi Deane Norris ==
In 1939, Stuart married Naomi Deane Norris, a school teacher. They settled in W Hollow and had one daughter, Jessica Jane. In Stuart's memoir, The Thread That Runs So True, he explains how he met Norris at Lonesome Valley. He was in college while she was still in high school; in fact, Stuart taught Norris in her last year of school.

== Education ==
After being denied admission at three colleges, Stuart was finally accepted at and attended Lincoln Memorial University, located in Harrogate, Tennessee. After graduating he returned to his home area and taught at Warnock High School in Greenup, Kentucky. Later he was appointed principal at McKell High School, but resigned after one year to attend graduate school at Vanderbilt University, where Edwin Mims was one of his professors. He then served as superintendent of the Greenup County Schools before ending his career as an English teacher at Portsmouth High School in Portsmouth, Ohio.

== Poetry ==
One day while Stuart was plowing in the field, he stopped and wrote the first line of a sonnet: "I am a farmer singing at the plow," the first line of the 703 sonnets he would collect in Man with a Bull-Tongue Plow (1934). The book was described by Irish poet George William Russell (who wrote poetry under the name of AE) as the greatest work of poetry to come out of America since Walt Whitman published Leaves of Grass. Stuart was named poet laureate for the Commonwealth of Kentucky in 1954, and in 1961 he received the annual award from the American Academy of Poets.

== Novels ==
Stuart's first novel was Trees of Heaven (1940). Set in rural Kentucky, the novel tells the story of Anse Bushman, who loves working the land and wants more land. Stuart's style is simple and sparse. Taps for Private Tussie (1943) is perhaps his most popular novel, selling more than a million copies in only two years. The novel also received critical praise and won the Thomas Jefferson Memorial Award for the best Southern book of the year. In 1974, Gale Research (in American Fiction, 1900-1950) identified Jesse Stuart as one of the forty-four novelists in the first half of the 20th century with high critical acclaim. Jesse Stuart was the second youngest of that group (William Saroyan was one year younger).

== Short stories ==
Stuart published about 460 short stories. He wrote his first short story "Nest Egg" when he was a sophomore in high school in 1923. The story is of a rooster at his farm, whose behavior was so dominant that it began attracting hens from other farms, leading to conflict with the neighbors. Twenty years later, he submitted the story unchanged to the Atlantic Monthly, which accepted the story and published it in February 1943; it was later collected in Tales from Plum Grove Hills.

One of his most anthologized stories is "Split Cherry Tree," first published in Esquire, January 1939. In this story, a high school teacher in a one-room schoolhouse keeps a boy after school to work and pay for damage he did to a cherry tree. The boy's uneducated father comes to school to argue with the teacher, but comes to appreciate the value of higher education.

== Enduring classic autobiography ==
The theme of education appears often in Stuart's books. He described the role that teaching played in his life in The Thread that Runs So True (1949), though he changed the names of places and people. He first taught school in rural Kentucky at the age of 16 at Cane Creek Elementary School, which became Lonesome Valley in his book. The Thread that Runs So True (1949) has become a classic of American education. Ruel Foster, a professor at West Virginia University, noted in 1968 that the book had good sales in its first year. At the time, he wrote, sales for the book had gone up in each successive year, an astonishing feat for any book. The book has remained continuously in print for more than 50 years.

== Death ==
In May 1982, Jesse Stuart suffered a stroke that left him comatose. Stuart died on February 17, 1984, at Jo-Lin Nursing Home, near his boyhood home, in Ironton, Ohio. He was 77 years old.

== Jesse Stuart State Nature Preserve ==
The natural settings of W Hollow were prominent throughout Stuart's writings. Prior to his death he donated 714 acres (2.89 km^{2}) of woodlands in W Hollow to the Office of Kentucky Nature Preserves. The Jesse Stuart State Nature Preserve is dedicated to protecting the legacy of Stuart, and ensures that a significant portion of W Hollow will remain undeveloped in perpetuity. The trail system is open to the public from dawn to dusk all year long.

== Books by Jesse Stuart ==
=== Poetry ===
- Man with a Bull-Tongue Plow, E.P. Dutton & Co., 1934
- Album of Destiny, E. P. Dutton & Co., Inc., 1944
- Kentucky is My Land, Dutton, 1952
- Hold April, McGraw-Hill Book Company, Inc., 1962

=== Autobiographical ===
- Beyond Dark Hills, E.P. Dutton & Company, Inc., 1938; Jesse Stuart Foundation, 1996, ISBN 978-0-945084-53-2
- The Thread that Runs So True. C. Scribner's Sons. 1950. ISBN 9780871296771.; Dramatic Publishing, 1958, ISBN 978-0-87129-677-1
- The Year of My Rebirth 1956; Jesse Stuart Foundation, 1991, ISBN 978-0-945084-17-4
- To Teach, To Love, World Pub. Co., 1970; Jesse Stuart Foundation, 1987, ISBN 978-0-945084-02-0
- My World. University Press of Kentucky. 1975. ISBN 978-0-8131-0211-5.

=== Novels ===
- Daughter of the Legend, McGraw-Hill, 1965; J. Stuart Foundation, 1994, ISBN 978-0-945084-42-6
- Trees of Heaven. E.P. Dutton & Co., Inc. 1940. ISBN 0813101506.; University Press of Kentucky, 1980, ISBN 978-0-8131-0150-7
- Taps for Private Tussie, E.P. Dutton, 1943; World Pub. Co., 1969
- Mongrel Mettle. E.P. Dutton. 1944.
- Foretaste of Glory. E. P. Dutton and Company, Inc. 1946. ISBN 0813101700.; University Press of Kentucky, 1986, ISBN 978-0-8131-0170-5
- Hie to the Hunters, Whittlesey House, 1950; Jesse Stuart Foundation, 1996, ISBN 978-0-945084-59-4
- Mr. Gallion's School, McGraw-Hill, 1967
- The Land Beyond the River, McGraw-Hill, 1973, ISBN 9780070622418
- ”The Kingdom Within:A Spiritual Autobiography”, McGraw Hill, 1979. ISBN 978-0070622241
- Cradle of the Copperheads, McGraw-Hill, 1988, ISBN 0-07-062366-X

=== For Young Readers ===
- The thread that runs so true, C. Scribner's Sons, 1950; Scribner, 1977, ISBN 978-0-684-15160-1
- The Beatinest Boy Whittlesey House, 1953; Jesse Stuart Foundation, 1989, ISBN 978-0-945084-12-9
- A Penny's Worth of Character, Whittlesey House, 1954; Jesse Stuart Foundation, 1993, ISBN 978-0-945084-32-7
- Red Mule 1955; Jesse Stuart Foundation, 1993, ISBN 978-0-945084-33-4
- A Ride with Huey, the Engineer 1966; Jesse Stuart Foundation, 1988, ISBN 978-0-945084-10-5
- Old Ben 1970; Jesse Stuart Foundation, 1992, ISBN 978-0-945084-22-8

=== Short story collections ===
- Head o' W-Hollow, E. P. Dutton & co., inc., 1936; Books for Libraries Press, 1971, ISBN 978-0-8369-4065-7
- Men of the Mountains. E. P. Dutton & co. 1941. ISBN 0813101433.; University Press of Kentucky, 1979, ISBN 978-0-8131-0143-9
- Tales from the Plum Grove Hills E. P. Dutton & Company, inc., 1946; Jesse Stuart Foundation, 1997, ISBN 978-0-945084-62-4
- Clearing in the Sky and Other Stories. McGraw-Hill. 1950., University Press of Kentucky, 1984, ISBN 978-0-8131-0157-6
- Plowshare in Heaven, McGraw-Hill, 1958
- Save Every Lamb, McGraw-Hill, 1964
- A Jesse Stuart Harvest, 1965; Mockingbird Books, 1976, ISBN 978-0-89176-010-8
- My Land Has a Voice, McGraw-Hill, 1966
- Come Gentle Spring, McGraw-Hill, 1969; Jesse Stuart Foundation, 2008, ISBN 978-1-931672-47-4
- Come Back to the Farm, McGraw-Hill, 1971; Jesse Stuart Foundation, 2001, ISBN 978-0-945084-94-5
- Dawn of the Remembered Spring, McGraw Hill, 1972
- 32 Votes Before Breakfast, McGraw-Hill, 1974
- The Best-Loved Stories of Jesse Stuart, McGraw-Hill, 1982, ISBN 9780070623057; Jesse Stuart Foundation, 2000, ISBN 9780945084815
- New Harvest: Forgotten Stories of Kentucky's Jesse Stuart, Jesse Stuart Foundation, 2003, ISBN 978-1-931672-17-7

== Books about Jesse Stuart ==
- Jesse Stuart: His Life and Works, by Everetta Love Blair (University of South Carolina Press, 1967)
- Jesse Stuart, by Ruel E. Foster (Twayne, 1968)
- Jesse Stuart: An Extraordinary Life, by James M. Gifford and Erin R. Kazee (Jesse Stuart Foundation, 2010)
- Jesse: The Biography of an American Writer, Jesse Hilton Stuart, by H. Edward Richardson (McGraw-Hill, 1984)
- New Harvest: Forgotten Stories of Kentucky's Jesse Stuart, by David R. Palmore (Jesse Stuart Foundation, 2003)
