= Richmond, Arkansas =

- Unincorporated community
- Location within Arkansas Location within the United States
- Coordinates: 33°38′15″N 94°12′27″W
- Country: United States
- State: Arkansas
- County: Little River
- Elevation: 331 ft (101 m)
- Time zone: UTC-6 (Central (CST))
  - Summer (DST): UTC-5 (CDT)
- GNIS feature ID: 58487

Richmond is an unincorporated community in Little River County, Arkansas, United States.

Richmond prospered as a commercial and political center during the late 1800s.

== History ==
The area was explored by Jean-Baptiste Bénard de la Harpe, who is believed to have camped northeast of Richmond in 1719.

Located approximately 3.5 mi (5.6 km) from the Red River, Richmond and other nearby settlements "existed mainly because of the river, which grew into a major commercial outlet from the 1830s to the 1890s".

Richmond was founded by settlers from Alabama around 1853. A one-room schoolhouse was built in 1854, and prior to 1861, a two-room school was erected near the earlier building. During the American Civil War, Judge Lewis Davis, father of Arkansas governor Jeff Davis, taught at the school. The school building was declared unsafe in 1902, so classes were moved to the old courthouse until around 1929, when a new brick school was built. The early schools were also used for church services.

In 1850, 5 acres (2.0 ha) of land located east of the settlement was donated for the establishment of Richmond Church and Cemetery. A post office was established in 1857.

During the American Civil War, troops of the Confederate States Army led by brigadier general Sterling Price camped at Richmond for three weeks in December 1864 while returning from battle. While there, 17 soldiers died and were buried in Richmond Cemetery. In 2012, a plaque commemorating their deaths was placed at the cemetery by the United Daughters of the Confederacy.

Richmond prospered during the late 1870s and early 1880s when it contained a chapter of the Woman's Missionary Society (1875); a Masonic Lodge (No.174); a steam-powered machine for grinding corn, sawing lumber, and ginning cotton (1876); a hotel called the Grand Central; a molasses mill, bank, blacksmith, churches, two gristmills, two drugstores, five law officials, and eight stores; and a newspaper called the Little River Pilot (1880). Also in 1880, a courthouse and jail were erected, and Richmond was named the county seat. After the courthouse burned in 1883, its rebuilding was paid for by the citizens of Richmond, who wanted their community to remain the county seat.

=== Decline ===
Railroads were built through Little River County in the late 1890s, thereby lessening the commercial importance of river navigation on which Richmond depended. The Texarkana and Fort Smith Railway was interested in building their railroad through Richmond, but some landowners refused to grant a right-of-way. The railway instead completed a line though nearby Ashdown in 1892. Without a railway, Richmond began to decline in population and importance. In 1902, the county seat was moved to Rocky Comfort, and in 1929 the post office closed.

== Geography ==
Palmetto Flats Natural Area, the largest contiguous block of alluvial terrace forest in the Red River Valley in Arkansas, is located west of Richmond.

== Notable person ==
- Edwin Mims, Chair of English at Vanderbilt University
