= William Yandell Elliott =

American historian

William Yandell Elliott (May 12, 1896 – January 9, 1979) was an American historian and a political advisor to six U.S. presidents.

== Biography ==
Born in Murfreesboro, Tennessee, he served as an artillery battery commander in World War I. He attended Vanderbilt University, where he was a member of the group of poets and literary scholars known as the Fugitives. As a Rhodes Scholar, he attended Balliol College, Oxford, where he read Philosophy, Politics and Economics and, among others, would meet the poet William Butler Yeats, the Indian nationalist Krishna Menon, and John Marshall Harlan II, a future Associate Justice of the Supreme Court. His dissertation, The Pragmatic Revolt in Politics, completed under supervision of A. D. Lindsay, proved to be influential.

He was hired by Harvard President Abbott Lawrence Lowell, and he was to remain at Harvard for the next 41 years. He became an advisor to a number of American presidents and presidential candidates, including Al Smith in 1928. He was a member of Franklin Roosevelt's Brain Trust in the 1930s and the 1940s and the Vice President of the War Production Board in Charge of Civilian Requirements during World War II. He also accompanied Roosevelt to the Yalta Conference.

After the war, Elliott served on the National Security Council. He was a scriptwriter for Republican Richard Nixon's 1960 election run, but Democratic Presidents John F. Kennedy and Lyndon Johnson retained him as a US State Department advisor.

He also taught at the Harvard Extension School. Elliott became dean of the Harvard Summer School, where he would establish the Harvard International Seminar, directed by his student and protégé Henry Kissinger. Many attendees went on to become heads of state or government in their respective countries, including Yigal Allon in Israel, Yasuhiro Nakasone in Japan, and Pierre Trudeau in Canada.

One of his sons, Ward Elliott, was a notable political scientist. Other sons include the late Charles Elliott and David Elliott, both political scientists.

== Influence ==
Elliott has become the recipient of recent attention, with historians Niall Ferguson and Sean Stone paying close interest to Elliott's role as Kissinger's mentor.
