= Walter Clyde Curry =

American academic and poet (1887–1967)

- Born: 1887; Gray Court, South Carolina, U.S.
- Died: October 2, 1967 (aged 79–80); Nashville, Tennessee, U.S.
- Education: Wofford College; Stanford University
- Occupations: Academic, poet
- Employer: Vanderbilt University
- Spouse: Kathryn Worth
- Parent(s): William Collier Curry; Martha Yeargin

Walter Clyde Curry (1887 - October 2, 1967) was an American academic, medievalist, and poet. He was a member of the Fugitives and the author of four books.

== Early life ==
Walter Clyde Curry was born in 1887 in Gray Court, South Carolina. He graduated from Wofford College, and he earned a master's degree and PhD from Stanford University.

== Career ==
Curry joined the English department at Vanderbilt University in 1915. A poet, he became a member of the Fugitives under the penname of Marpha in the 1920s. He taught at Peabody College from 1930 to 1941. He was the chair of the English department at Vanderbilt University from 1941 to 1955. On his retirements, his former students, including Cleanth Brooks, published a volume of essays about Curry's scholarship.

Curry was a medievalist, and a member of the Medieval Academy of America. He was also a member of the Modern Language Association.

== Personal life and death ==
Curry married Kathryn Worth in 1927. They had a daughter, who married Joseph Rainey. He died on October 2, 1967, in Nashville, at the age of 80.

== Selected works ==
- Curry, Walter Clyde (1916). The Middle English Ideal of Personal Beauty; As Found in the Metrical Romances, Chronicles, and Legends of the XIII, XIV, and XV Centuries. Baltimore, Maryland: J. H. Furst Company.
- Curry, Walter Clyde (1926). Chaucer and the Mediaeval Sciences. New York: Oxford University Press.
- Curry, Walter Clyde (1937). Shakespeare's Philosophical Patterns. Baton Rouge, Louisiana: Louisiana State University Press.
- Curry, Walter Clyde (1958). Milton's Ontology, Cosmogony and Physics. Lexington, Kentucky: University of Kentucky Press.
