= Tennessee Agricultural Museum =

- Location: Brentwood, Williamson County, Tennessee, United States
- Coordinates: 36.0625°N 86.7460°W
- Website: tnagmuseum.org

The Tennessee Agricultural Museum is an agricultural museum based at the Ellington Agricultural Center in Brentwood, Tennessee. It organizes the Annual Rural Life Festival.
