= James Erwin Caldwell =

American businessman and banker (1854–1944)

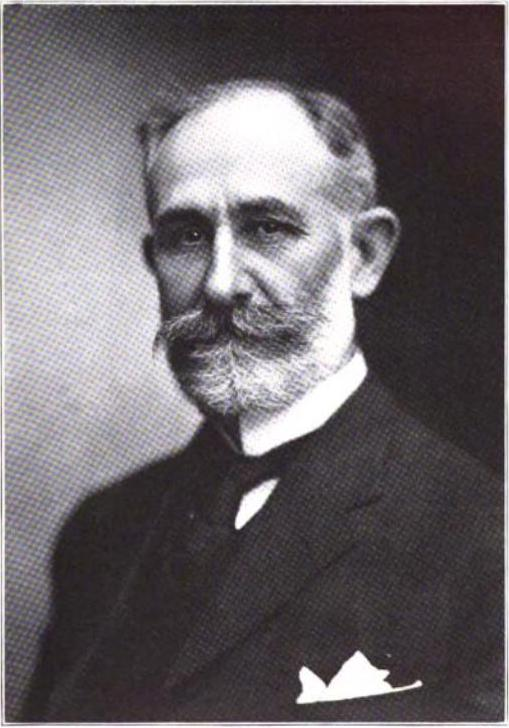
- Born: September 18, 1854; Memphis, Tennessee, U.S.
- Died: September 26, 1944 (aged 90); Nashville, Tennessee, U.S.
- Resting place: Mount Olivet Cemetery
- Occupations: Businessman, banker
- Spouse: May Winston
- Children: Rogers Caldwell

James Erwin Caldwell (September 18, 1854 – September 26, 1944) was an American businessman and banker from Tennessee. He served as the President of the Cumberland Telephone & Telegraph Company, later taken over by Southern Bell Telephone and Telegraph Company (now part of AT&T), which installed telephones across the Southern United States.

== Early life ==
James Erwin Caldwell was born on September 18, 1854, in Memphis, Tennessee.

== Career ==
Caldwell acquired a controlling interested in the Cumberland Telephone and Telegraph Company in 1890. The firm installed telephones in Tennessee, Kentucky, Mississippi, Louisiana, as well as Southern Illinois and Indiana. By 1912, its capitalization was US$20,000,000. Caldwell served as its President until 1912, when he became its Chairman. That same year, it merged with the Southern Bell Telephone and Telegraph Company, and Caldwell served as its President.

Caldwell was a large shareholder of the Fourth National Bank. When it merged with the Third National Bank of St. Louis in 1912, he became President of the First and Fourth National Bank of Nashville. The new bank was headquartered in The Stahlman in Downtown Nashville. The bank merged with the American National Bank in 1930. He retired shortly after. However, by 1932, Caldwell was sued for fraud regarding the sale of shares during the merger.

Caldwell was a major shareholder of the Rodessa Oil and Land Co. In 1937, he was ordered by the chancery court to surrender his stock to cover some of his son Rogers's debt to the State of Tennessee.

Caldwell recommended John Trotwood Moore for State Librarian and Archivist of Tennessee to Governor Albert H. Roberts in 1919.

== Personal life ==
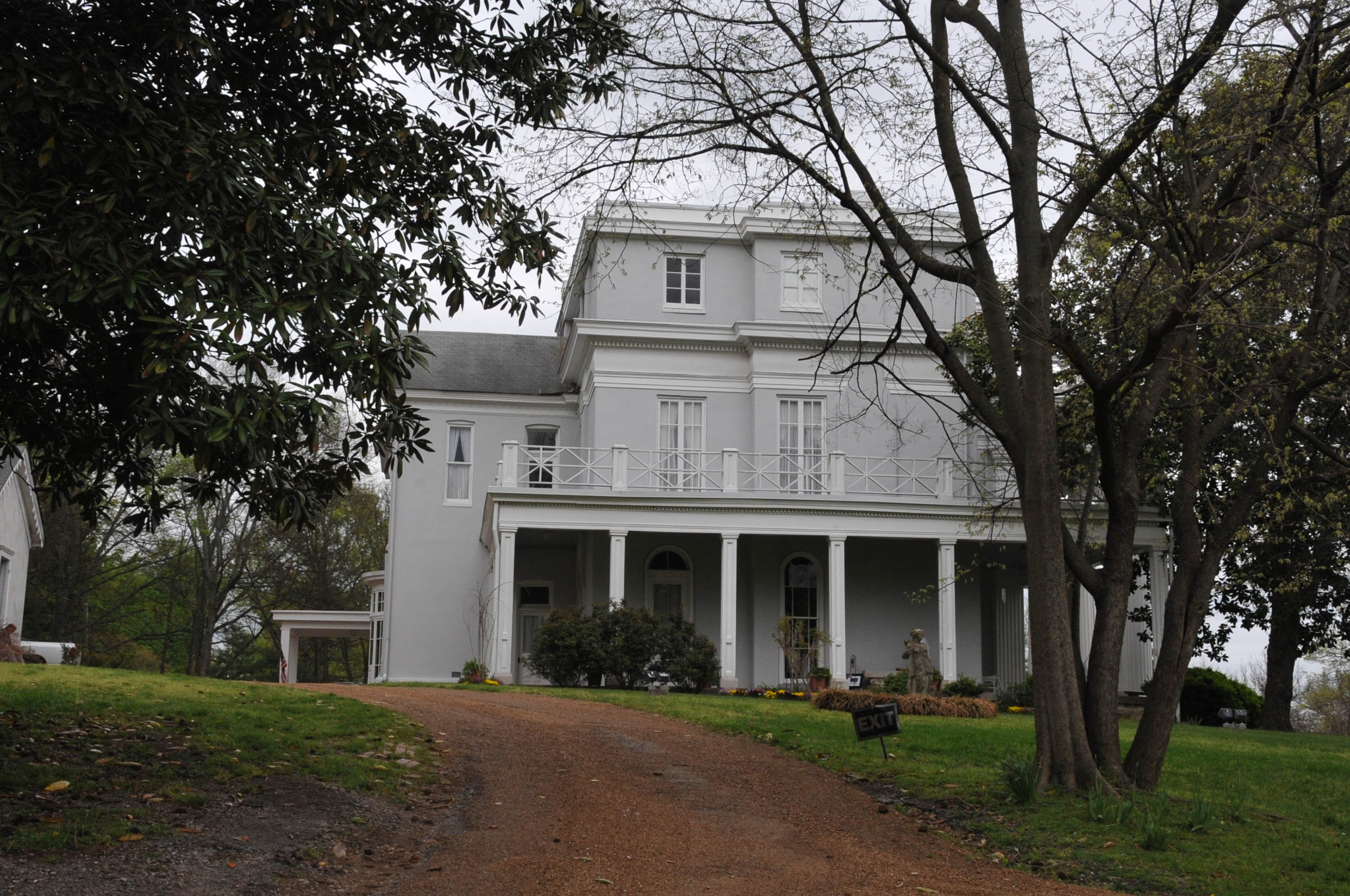
Longview.

Caldwell married May Winston. They resided at Longview, an antebellum mansion in Nashville, now owned by Lipscomb University. They had several children, including Rogers Caldwell, known as the "J.P. Morgan of the South."

== Death ==
Caldwell died on September 26, 1944, in Nashville, Tennessee. He was buried at the Mount Olivet Cemetery.
