= Longview (Nashville, Tennessee) =

Historic house in Tennessee, United States

- U.S. National Register of Historic Places
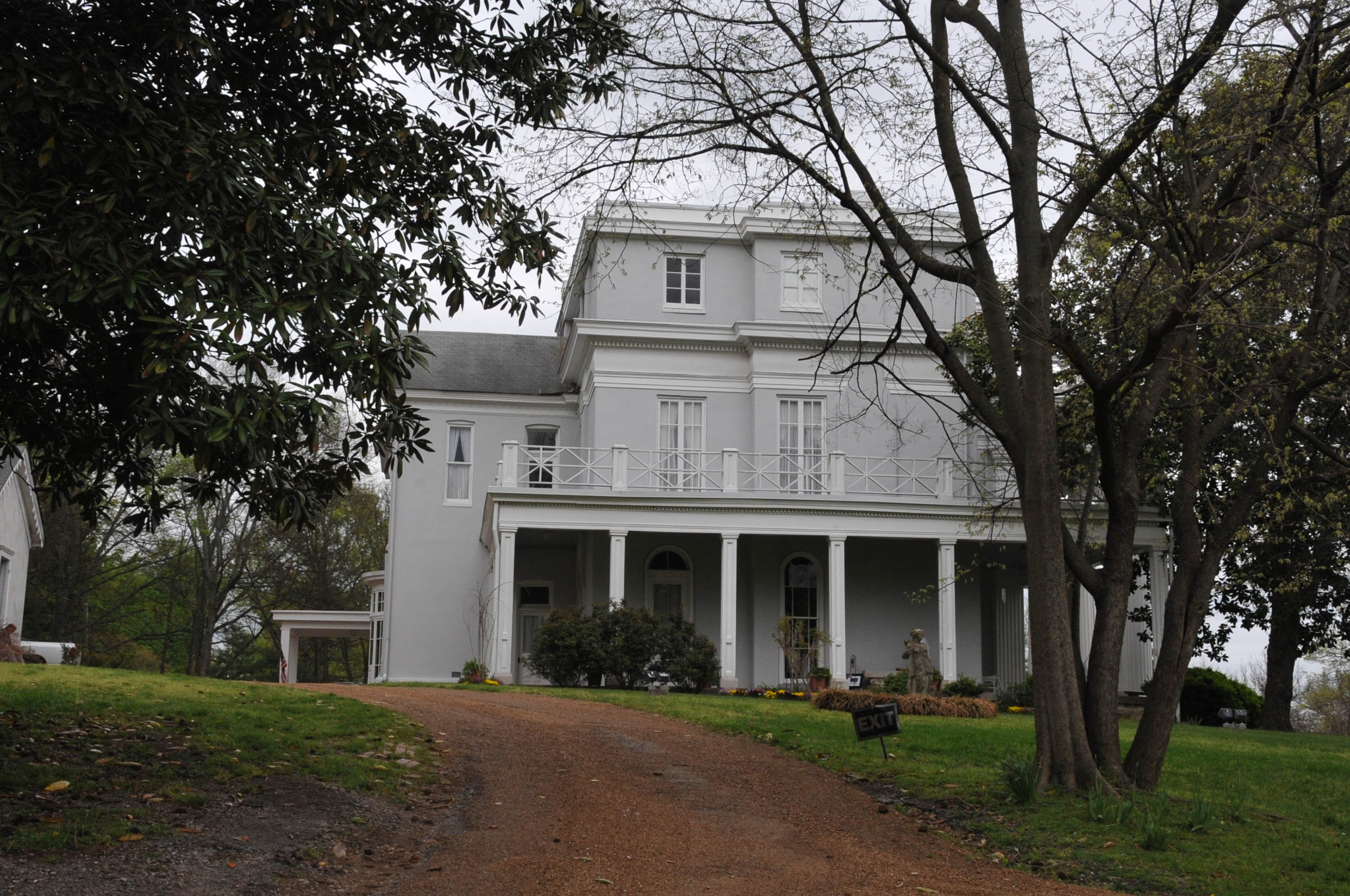
- Longview in 2008

- Location within Tennessee Location within the United States
- Location: 811 Caldwell lane, Nashville, Tennessee, U.S.
- Coordinates: 36°06′21.6″N 86°46′32.5″W
- Area: 1.3 acres (0.53 ha)
- Built: 1850
- Architectural style: Beaux-Arts
- NRHP reference No.: 83003027
- Added to NRHP: January 12, 1983

Longview is a historic mansion in Nashville, Tennessee, USA.

== Location ==
The mansion is located at 811 Caldwell lane in South Nashville, the county seat of Davidson County, Tennessee and capital of the state.

== History ==
A one-story cottage was built in the Antebellum era for Henry Norvell and Laura Sevier, the granddaughter of John Sevier, who had served as the first Governor of Tennessee. During the Civil War, the house was used by Confederate General John Bell Hood in his preparation before the Battle of Nashville of December 15–16, 1864.

In 1878, the cottage was purchased by James Erwin Caldwell, the president of the Cumberland Telephone and Telegraph Company, which installed the Bell System in the American South. Caldwell redesigned the house in the Italianate architectural style, and added a second story. He lived there with his wife, Mary Winston, and their ten children.

The house was redesigned in the Beaux-Arts architectural style in 1906. In that process, the house was expanded with a portico, a winding staircase, and an attic in the third story.

After Caldwell's death, the house was sold to the Franklin Road Church of Christ. It was converted into a church building, and it remained a church for eight years. In 1960, the house was purchased by Dr Nicholas de Palma. He sold it in 1977.

== Architectural significance ==
It has been listed on the National Register of Historic Places since January 12, 1983.
