= Merrill Moore (poet) =

American poet, psychiatrist

- Merrill Moore in 1956
- Born: September 11, 1903; Columbia, Tennessee, U.S.
- Died: September 20, 1957 (aged 54); Boston, Massachusetts, U.S.
- Education: Montgomery Bell Academy
- Alma mater: Vanderbilt University
- Occupations: M.D., psychiatrist, poet
- Parent(s): John Trotwood Moore; Mary Brown Daniel

Merrill Moore (1903 – 1957) was an American psychiatrist and poet. Born and educated in Tennessee, he was a member of the Fugitives. He taught neurology at the Harvard Medical School and published research about alcoholism. He was the author of many collections of poetry.

== Early life ==
Moore was born in 1903 in Columbia, Tennessee. His father, John Trotwood Moore, was a novelist and local historian who served as the State Librarian and Archivist from 1919 to 1929. His paternal grandfather was a lawyer from Marion, Alabama, who served in the Confederate States Army during the American Civil War.

Moore was educated at Montgomery Bell Academy in Nashville, Tennessee, graduating in 1920. He attended Vanderbilt University, where he became a member of the Sigma Chi fraternity. He also joined the Fugitives, a group of then unknown poets who met to read and criticize each other's poems. He graduated with a bachelor's degree in 1924. He took an M.D. from the Vanderbilt University School of Medicine in 1928. He interned at the Saint Thomas Hospital in Nashville for a year.

== Career as a psychiatrist ==
Moore was a psychiatrist in the Ericksonian tradition. He taught neurology at the Harvard Medical School and the Boston City Hospital. He also conducted research on alcohol and addiction. In a 1937 article published in the New England Journal of Medicine, he argued that alcoholism had become rampant in the United States, and he called for the establishment of special wards for alcoholics in hospitals. Two years later, in the same journal, he argued that the heavier an individual, the less likely they were to feel drunk. By 1943, in the Boston number of the Medical Clinics of North America, he argued that adult neurosis and alcoholism could be prevented if parents ensured children matched the skills of their peers and never "go off the track of normal development". He also published articles in medical journals about "drug addiction, suicide, venereal disease [...], the psychoneurosis of war, migraine headaches." Meanwhile, Moore also treated patients like Robert Frost's daughter, who had paranoia and depression.

During World War II, Moore served as a psychiatrist in the United States Army's Bougainville Campaign as well as in New Zealand. On September 22, 1942, Moore gave a speech about Adolf Hitler's Mein Kampf entitled What Hitler means in "Mein Kampf" at the Fitzsimons Army Medical Center in Aurora, Colorado; a year later, it was reprinted in Military Surgeon. Moore served as Lieutenant-Colonel in Nanking, where he was "director of medical operations". He was the recipient of the Bronze Star Medal for his war service.

After the war, Moore played a key behind-the-scenes role in the Ezra Pound controversy, as a member of a group of literary men who saw to it that the modernist icon escaped a treason trial for his radio propaganda in support of Mussolini. Moore was a close friend of one of the psychiatrists on a diagnostic panel that found Pound unfit to stand trial.

== Poetry ==
Throughout his career Moore produced sonnets in a very high volume. Estimates vary but by 1935, Louis Untermeyer had counted 25,000 sonnets in Moore's files, according to a Time Magazine article that year; just over two years later, a 1938 Talk of the Town piece in the New Yorker put Moore's total production of sonnets at 50,000.

Moore discovered his affinity for the sonnet form while still in secondary school and is said to have learned shorthand during college in order to be able to write more sonnets between classes. Although some of his work, such as the posthumous quatrain collection The Phoenix and the Bees, is in other forms, the poet-psychiatrist wrote and archived his poems in a dedicated home office he called his "sonnetorium." Some of his books, like Case Record from a Sonnetorium or More Clinical Sonnets, were illustrated by Edward Gorey.

It was Moore who put the young Robert Lowell in contact with literary men including Ford Madox Ford, Allen Tate and John Crowe Ransom, and who encouraged Lowell to become a student of Ransom after Lowell's sudden violent break with his family and departure from Harvard.

== Personal life and death ==
Moore married to Ann Leslie Nichol in 1930. Together they had four children: Adam, John, Leslie, and Hester. He published articles about conchology.

Moore died of cancer on September 21, 1957, in Boston, Massachusetts. He was 54.

== Published works ==
- Moore, Merrill (1929). The Noise That Time Makes. New York: Harcourt, Brace and Company. OCLC 1496636.
- Moore, Merrill (1935). Six Sides to a Man. New York: Harcourt, Brace and Company. OCLC 2758342.
- Moore, Merrill (1938). M: one thousand autobiographical sonnets. New York: Harcourt, Brace and Co. OCLC 1021968.
- Moore, Merrill (1943). What Hitler means in "Mein Kampf". Washington, D.C. OCLC 40772505.
- Moore, Merrill (1949). Clinical Sonnets. New York: Twayne Publisher. OCLC 2337239.
- Moore, Merrill (1950). Illegitimate Sonnets. New York: Twayne Publishers. OCLC 2029792.
- Moore, Merrill (1951). Case-Record from a Sonnetorium. New York: Twayne Publishers. OCLC 2654041.
- Moore, Merrill (1953). More Clinical Sonnets. New York: Twayne Publishers. OCLC 2770322.
- Moore, Merrill (1954). The Verse-diary of a psychiatrist. Baltimore: Contemporary Poetry. OCLC 1999532.
- Moore, Merrill (1955). A Doctor's Book of Hours, Including Some Dimensions of the Emotions. Springfield, Illinois: Thomas. OCLC 289418.
- Moore, Merrill (1957). The Hill of Venus. Poems of Men and Women Reacting To, Puzzled By, and Suffering From Love, Its Fulfillments and Its Frustrations. New York: Twayne Publishers. OCLC 3371610.
- Moore, Merrill (1959). The Phoenix and the Bees. Baltimore: Contemporary Poetry. OCLC 1525849.
