= Fugitives (poets) =

Literary group in Tennessee, US

The Fugitives, also known as the Fugitive Poets, is the name given to a group of poets and literary scholars at Vanderbilt University in Nashville, Tennessee, who published a literary magazine from 1922 to 1925 called The Fugitive. The group, primarily driven by Robert Penn Warren, John Crowe Ransom, Donald Davidson, and Allen Tate, formed a major school of twentieth century poetry in the United States. With it, a major period of modern Southern literature began. Their poetry was formal and featured traditional prosody and concrete imagery often from experiences of the rural south. The group has some overlap with two later movements: Southern Agrarians and New Criticism.

== History ==
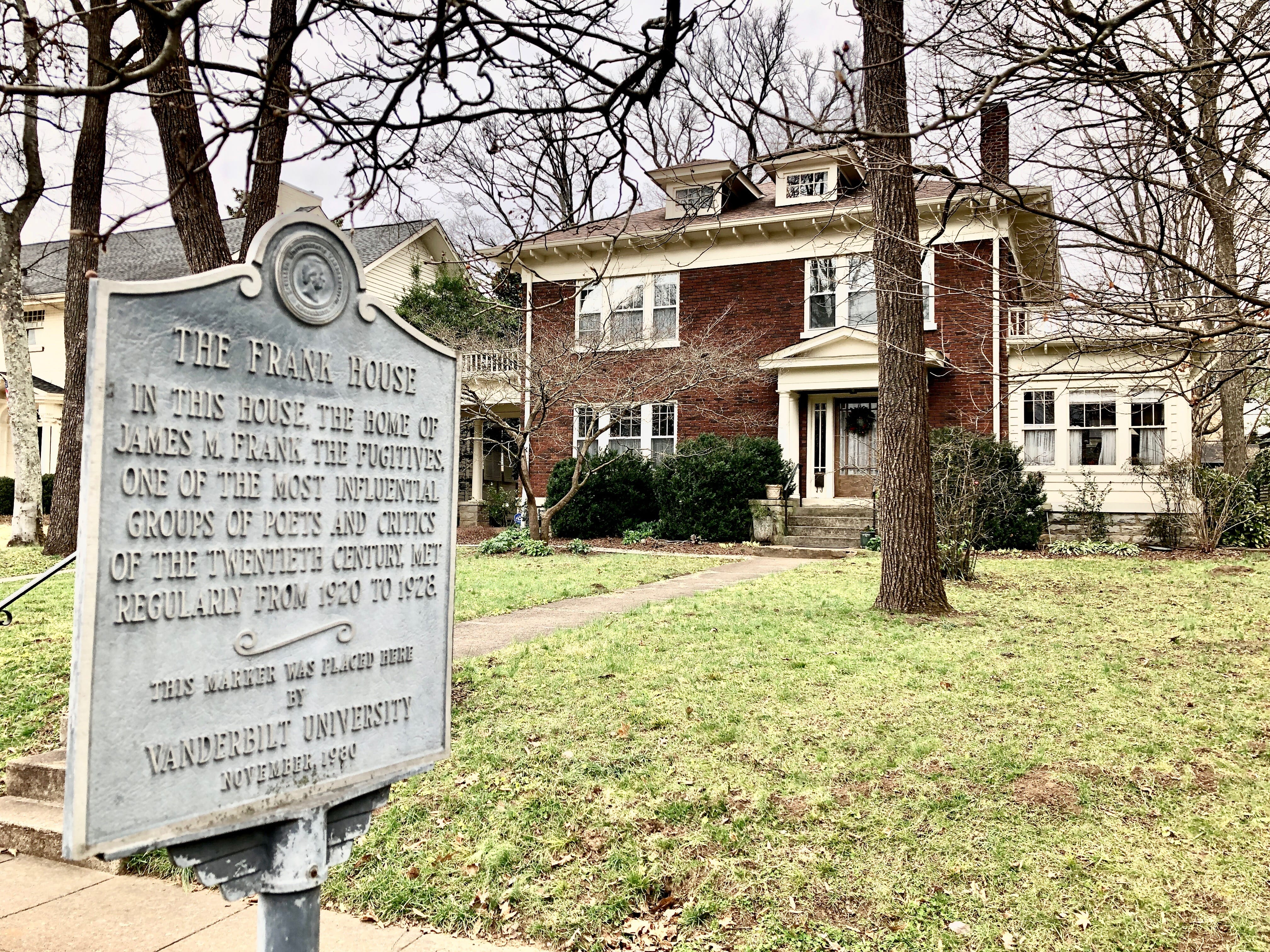
James Marshall Frank home at 3802 Whitland Avenue, Nashville, Tennessee, where the Fugitive Poets regularly met from 1920 to 1928 (photo: December, 2021)

About 1920, a group consisting of some influential teachers of literature at Vanderbilt, a few townies, and some students began meeting on alternate Saturday nights at the home of James Marshall Frank and his brother-in-law Sidney Mttron Hirsch on Whitland Avenue in Nashville. They met as a poetry workshop with no formal connection with the university. After a couple of years, Hirsch felt their poetry was good enough to publish. According to author Louise Cowan, "...half-seriously Alec Stevenson suggested as a title "The Fugitive" after a poem of Hirsch's which had been read and discussed at an earlier meeting." Allen Tate stated, "...a Fugitive was quite simply a Poet: the Wanderer, or even the Wandering Jew, the Outcast, the man who carries the secret wisdom around the world". They published a small literary magazine, The Fugitive (1922–1925), which showcased their works using noms de plume at first. Although its publication history was brief, The Fugitive is considered to be one of the most influential journals in the history of American letters. The Fugitives embodied all the main influences at work in the American Literary Renaissance of the twentieth century.

== Founders ==
The group was noted for the number of its members whose works were recognized with a permanent place in the literary canon. Among the most notable Fugitives were John Crowe Ransom, Allen Tate, Merrill Moore, Donald Davidson, William Ridley Wills, and Robert Penn Warren. Other members include Sidney Mttron Hirsch, Stanley P. Johnson, James M. Frank, Jesse Ely Wills, Walter Clyde Curry, Alec B. Stevenson, William Yandell Elliott, and William Frierson. Two of the members (Warren and Tate) later became United States Poets Laureate.

In "The Briar Patch", Robert Penn Warren provided a look at the life of an exploited black person in urban America. "The Briar Patch" was a defense both of segregation, and of the doctrine of "separate but equal," enshrined by Plessy v. Ferguson (1896). (Warren later recanted the views expressed in "The Briar Patch".) Less closely associated with the Fugitives were the critic Cleanth Brooks and the poet Laura Riding.

The Fugitives partly overlapped with a later group, also associated with Vanderbilt, called the Agrarians. Some of the Fugitives were part of the latter group. Another group known as the New Critics, was a later school that emerged from the Fugitives, named for Ransom's 1941 book, The New Criticism.

== Anthologies ==
The first comprehensive collection of the Fugitives' poetry was published by William C. Pratt, Professor of English at Miami University in Oxford, Ohio. Following that, a second anthology was subsequently created after many of the major works were revised. A third anthology, The Fugitive poets : Modern Southern Poetry in Perspective was published in 1991 by Pratt and included additional works by the original poets.

== See also ==
- Tennessee literature
