= National Life and Accident Insurance Company =

American insurance company (1900-1982)

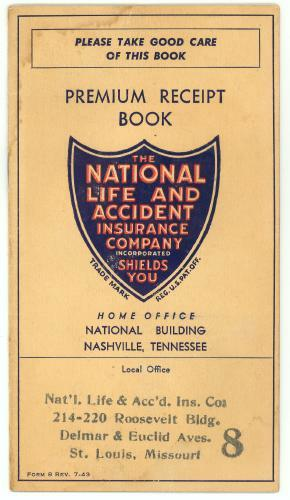
- An original premium receipt book of the National Life and Accident Insurance Company
- Company type: Private company
- Industry: Financial services
- Predecessor: National Sick and Accident Association
- Founded: 1900
- Defunct: 1982
- Fate: Acquired in hostile takeover
- Successor: American General Corporation
- Headquarters: Nashville, Tennessee, United States
- Area served: Most of the United States
- Products: Life insurance

The National Life and Accident Insurance Company was an American life insurance company based in Nashville, Tennessee, that operated from 1900 until it was acquired in a hostile takeover in 1982 by American General Corporation.

== History ==
=== Foundation ===
National Life and Accident began in 1900 as the National Sick and Accident Association, a mutual company. It was reorganized as a stock company and adopted the National Life name shortly thereafter.

The motto of National Life & Accident was "We Shield Millions". The radio station call letters "WSM," seen on the microphones of the Grand Ole Opry, reflected the motto of National Life; the insurance company owned the radio station and the Opry until the 1980s.

=== "Sick and accident" policies ===
In December 1901, the National Sick and Accident Association was sold to C. A. Craig to settle an estate. By 1902, the company was nearly insolvent. In the early years, the company's business consisted primarily of low-premium, low-benefit "sick and accident" policies, which is a form of disability insurance that paid the holder a stated amount for every week he was unable to work due to illness or injury. To prevent fraud, the amount of the benefit was limited to somewhat less than the regular earnings of the insured. The vast majority of the policies, especially during the early years, were sold on the "debit system" (also called "home service insurance"), meaning that an insurance agent employed by the company, usually the salesman, made periodic visits to the client's home to collect the premium (and, generally, attempt to sell more insurance). The frequency of these visits was typically weekly in the early years; in later years the collection visits were more often bi-weekly or monthly. Most of the company's clients were African Americans.

=== Industrial life and accidental death and dismemberment insurance ===
The company soon expanded into "industrial life insurance," so named because it was generally aimed at industrial workers, which was also sold on the debit system, and accidental death and dismemberment insurance, which rather than a weekly income paid a stated, fixed amount, if the insured died by accident or lost sight or use of an eye or a limb. The industrial life insurance plans were usually for small face amounts: typically $250, $500, or $1,000 in the early years. They featured double indemnity for accidental loss of life, which could be triple indemnity or even more if death occurred as the result of an accident on a public conveyance. For this reason, these plans were often derided by their detractors as "streetcar insurance."

=== Expansion ===
The company gradually expanded its operations to the south-eastern seaboard and eventually covered most of the continental U.S. except the northeast, the Rocky Mountain states, and the Pacific Northwest. It also began to write "ordinary life" insurance to better risks, such as middle-class office workers, religious ministers, accountants, and bankers.

Its greatest marketing development was the beginning of WSM radio on October 5, 1925. Taking its callsign from the company's motto, We Shield Millions (which was in turn taken from its shield-shaped logo), the station broadcast advertising, including the company's own messages, over its powerful 1,000 watt station, which in January 1927 increased to 5,000 watts, and in November 1932, became a 50 kilowatt "clear channel" station (meaning that no other station could broadcast on that frequency during nighttime hours). Its studios were at first in the National Life office building in downtown Nashville at Seventh and Union Streets. On November 28, 1925, management began the program that soon became the Grand Ole Opry, which made country music (then commonly called "hillbilly music") a regional, and eventually national, cultural phenomenon. On September 25, 1950, the company spawned Nashville's first television station, WSM-TV (now WSMV-TV).

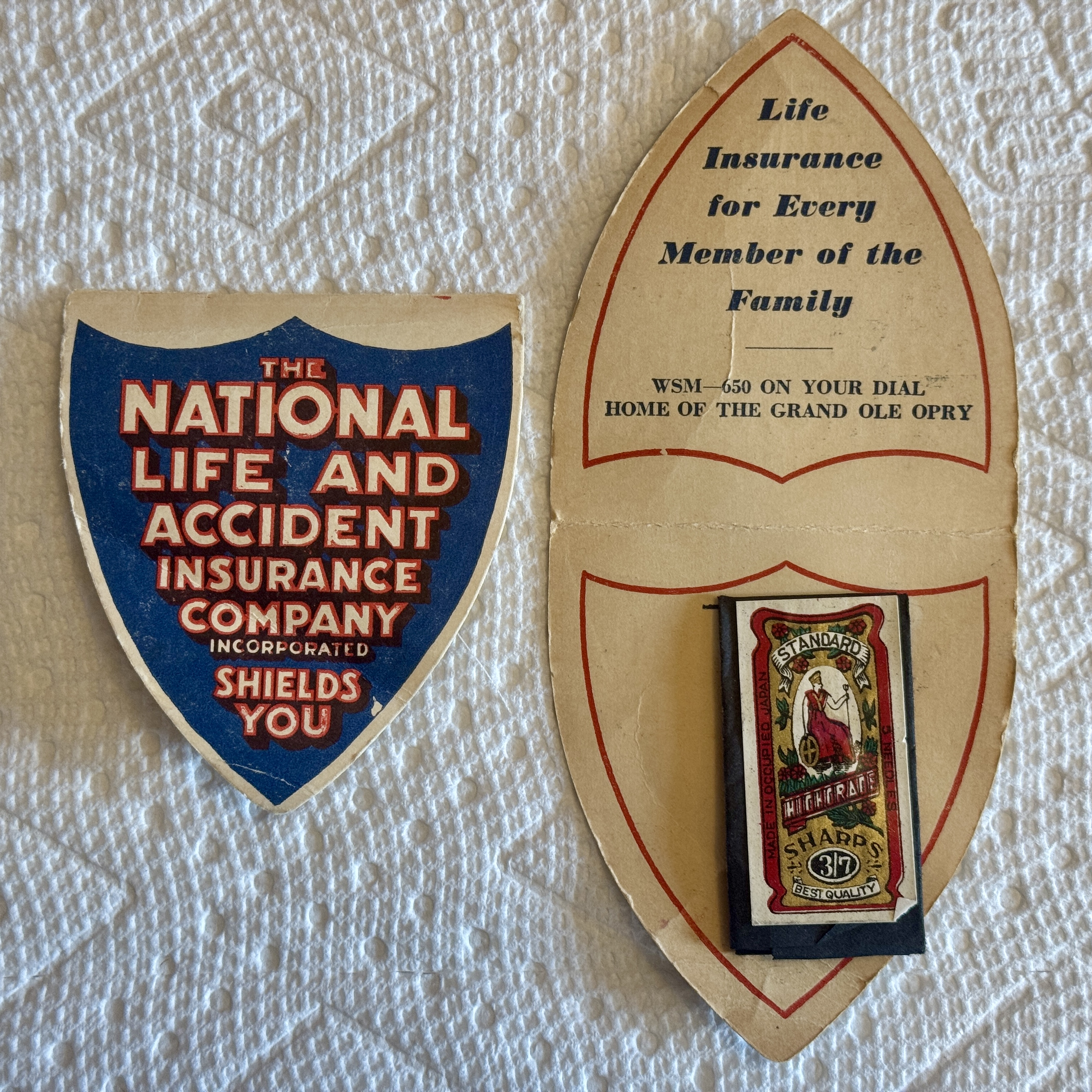
Advertisement with a packet of sewing needles given to customers

=== Evolution and takeover ===
U.S. life insurers faced a crisis with the coming of the Great Depression in 1929. Like many of them, National Life survived by offering its clients policy loans against the plans' cash values. With World War II came another crisis due to the manpower shortage brought about by conscription. In some areas, premium collections, at least on a weekly basis, had to be curtailed (gasoline rationing was a factor) and many clients who were used to having their premiums collected in person by an agent found themselves having to take the initiative to mail in their premiums or lose their coverage.

By the mid-1960s the company had outgrown its home office in downtown Nashville. It had also been overshadowed by one of its principal competitors, the Life and Casualty Insurance Company of Tennessee ("L&C"), whose 31-story skyscraper in 1957 was, briefly, Nashville's only skyscraper and the tallest building in the Southeast. The new National Life building, across the street from the Tennessee State Capitol, was completed in 1970 and had 30 stories. It was both considerably larger and located on higher terrain, so it appeared to be grander than its rival, as intended.

By this point, the television studios of WSM (which began in 1950 as the first Nashville television station) had moved to West Nashville near the station's transmitting tower in 1963; the radio stations followed in 1966. In 1969, a plan was announced to build a theme park on the property of Rudy's Farm, a sausage company located in the Pennington Bend of the Cumberland River. The park opened in 1972 as "Opryland USA." Other than the usual selection of thrill rides and "kiddie rides," the park featured shows of diverse genres of American music, not just country. Construction began on the new Grand Ole Opry House at about the same time, and the Opry left the deteriorating Ryman Auditorium for the new facility adjacent to the theme park in March 1974.

Around the time of the home office move, National Life reorganized as a holding company, "NLT Corporation," (NLT) with the "NL" standing for "National Life" and the "T" standing for Third National Bank, one of Nashville's leading banks (acquired in the 1990s by SunTrust). Banking laws and regulations of the period thwarted the acquisition of Third National but the holding-company was maintained.

Another development of the 1970s was the phasing out of weekly premiums; the former weekly premium was multiplied by 4.3 and became the monthly premium for the same coverage.

In the early 1980s, Houston's American General Corporation (AGC), another insurance holding company, announced a hostile takeover bid for NLT. NLT made a counter-offer to buy out AGC. In 1982 AGC, which had owned Nashville rival L&C since the 1960s, prevailed. Having acquired NLT, AGC merged the former rivals over the next decade and spun off the "non-core" assets of NLT, particularly its entertainment properties. The Grand Ole Opry, Opryland USA, WSM, and then-fledgling cable television network The Nashville Network (TNN) were sold to what became Gaylord Entertainment Company and later on, ViacomCBS. In 2001, American General was acquired by New York-based American International Group (AIG); its division of the corporation retained the American General brand. In January 1994, the National Life/American General building was sold to the State of Tennessee and became the William R. Snodgrass Tennessee Tower, named in honor of the former state comptroller.
