= Paul Hamilton Hayne =

American journalist

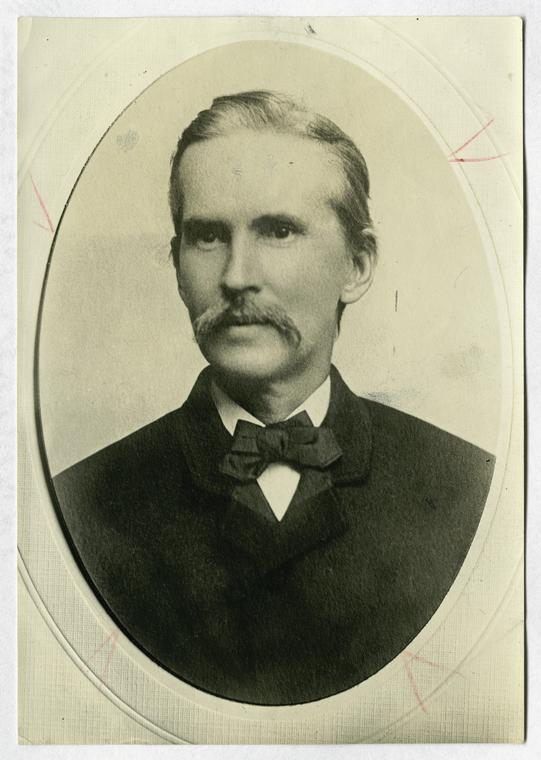
- Born: January 1, 1830; Charleston, South Carolina, U.S.
- Died: July 6, 1886 (aged 56); Copse Hill mansion, near Grovetown, Georgia, U.S.
- Resting place: Magnolia Cemetery, Augusta, Georgia, U.S.

Paul Hamilton Hayne (January 1, 1830 – July 6, 1886) was a poet, critic, and editor from the American South.

== Biography ==
Paul Hamilton Hayne Jr. was born in Charleston, South Carolina, on January 1, 1830, the son of Paul Hamilton Hayne Sr. and Emily McElhenny. After losing his father as a young child, Hayne was reared by his mother in the home of his prosperous and prominent uncle, Robert Y. Hayne, who was an orator and politician who served in the United States Senate and was Governor of South Carolina. Another uncle was Arthur Peronneau Hayne.

Hayne was educated in Charleston city schools and graduated from the College of Charleston in 1852, the year he married Mary Middleton Michele, with whom he had one child: fellow poet William Hamilton Hayne.

He began the practice of law but soon abandoned it in order to pursue his literary interests and ambitions. Hayne served in the Confederate army in 1861 and remained in the army until his health failed after four months, where he served as aide-de-camp to South Carolina Governor Francis Pickens. He lost all of his possessions — including his house and an extensive library — when Charleston was bombarded in 1862. In 1863, Hayne moved his family to Grovetown, Georgia, a wooded area about 16 miles from Augusta, Georgia. Here, Hayne lived and worked until his death in 1886. Grovetown was also where his career as a literary critic and magazine editor began. He contributed to important magazines of the South during his era, including the Charleston Literary Gazette, the Southern Literary Messenger, the Home Journal, and Southern Bivouac. Hayne was also instrumental with Southern novelist William Gilmore Simms in the founding of Russell's Magazine, which Hayne edited.

Hayne is also noteworthy for his friendship with fellow Southern poet Henry Timrod, whom Hayne helped with both his life and his career. Timrod was frail and ill throughout his life with tuberculosis, and Hayne helped to provide financially for Timrod and his wife and young son. Most importantly for literature and history, Hayne preserved Timrod's poems and edited them into a collection that was published in 1872 and that presented such historically important poems as "The Cotton Boll" and "Ode Sung On The Occasion Of Decorating The Graves Of The Confederate Dead". Timrod now has the greater reputation as a poet, while Hayne is known more for his role as an editor and literary critic than as a poet. Timrod has continued to influence other modern Southern writers, including the poet Allen Tate, whose most famous poem, "Ode to the Confederate Dead", owes a great deal to Timrod's similarly titled poem.

Hayne had a friendship also with Sidney Lanier. Though the two never met, they corresponded, and advised each other—Hayne suggested to Lanier that he leave the medievalism of his poem "The Jacquerie" alone and turn to Southern topics, and Lanier helping Hayne to strive for "more simplicity and directness in his poems".

Hayne died at his home, Copse Hill, near Grovetown, Georgia, on July 6, 1886. He was buried in Magnolia Cemetery in Augusta. With the help of a caretaker, Hayne's son, William, oversaw Copse Hill after the death of his mother in 1892 but, in a letter written to Lucian Lamar Knight around 1912, explained that he did not have the means to keep it in the condition his parents had. He mentioned his father's library was still there. Hayne's papers are variously preserved in the libraries of the College of Charleston, Duke University, the University of Virginia, and the South Carolina Historical Society.

== Writings ==
Hayne's first volume of poetry, Poems, was published in 1855 by Ticknor and Fields; not every critic loved it, but it drew attention from national magazines, more so than any of his later volumes. Sonnets and Other Poems (1857) sold fewer than 200 copies, and Avolio (1859) was little noticed despite a positive review by James Russell Lowell. After the Civil War, Legends and Lyrics (1872) and The Mountains of the Lovers (1875) fared no better. A complete edition appeared in 1882. His poetry emphasizes romantic verse, long narrative poems, and ballads. Like other fellow Southern poets of his day, his work was highly descriptive of nature. Some critics contend that his graceful lyrics reflect the influence of poet John Keats. In a review of his work by Rayburn S. Moore, his influences are described as also including Geoffrey Chaucer, Edmund Spenser, William Wordsworth, and Alfred Tennyson, although the derivative nature and lack of intellectual force are considered weaknesses. Moore considers strengths of Hayne's poetry to include the authenticity of detail and observation of locality and situation as well as the versatility of forms, metrical schemes, and techniques, especially in short poems and sonnets. Hayne's sonnets are considered his best work. He was appreciated even in the north and became known as an unofficial poet laureate of the South, and at least one scholar referred to him as a "Poet of the Confederacy".

The Paul Hayne School in Birmingham, Alabama, was named for Hayne after he sent an original poem and book of verse to the school on the occasion of its dedication in 1886.

== See also ==
- Four Southern Poets Monument
