= Idler's Retreat =

Historic house in Tennessee, United States

- U.S. National Register of Historic Places
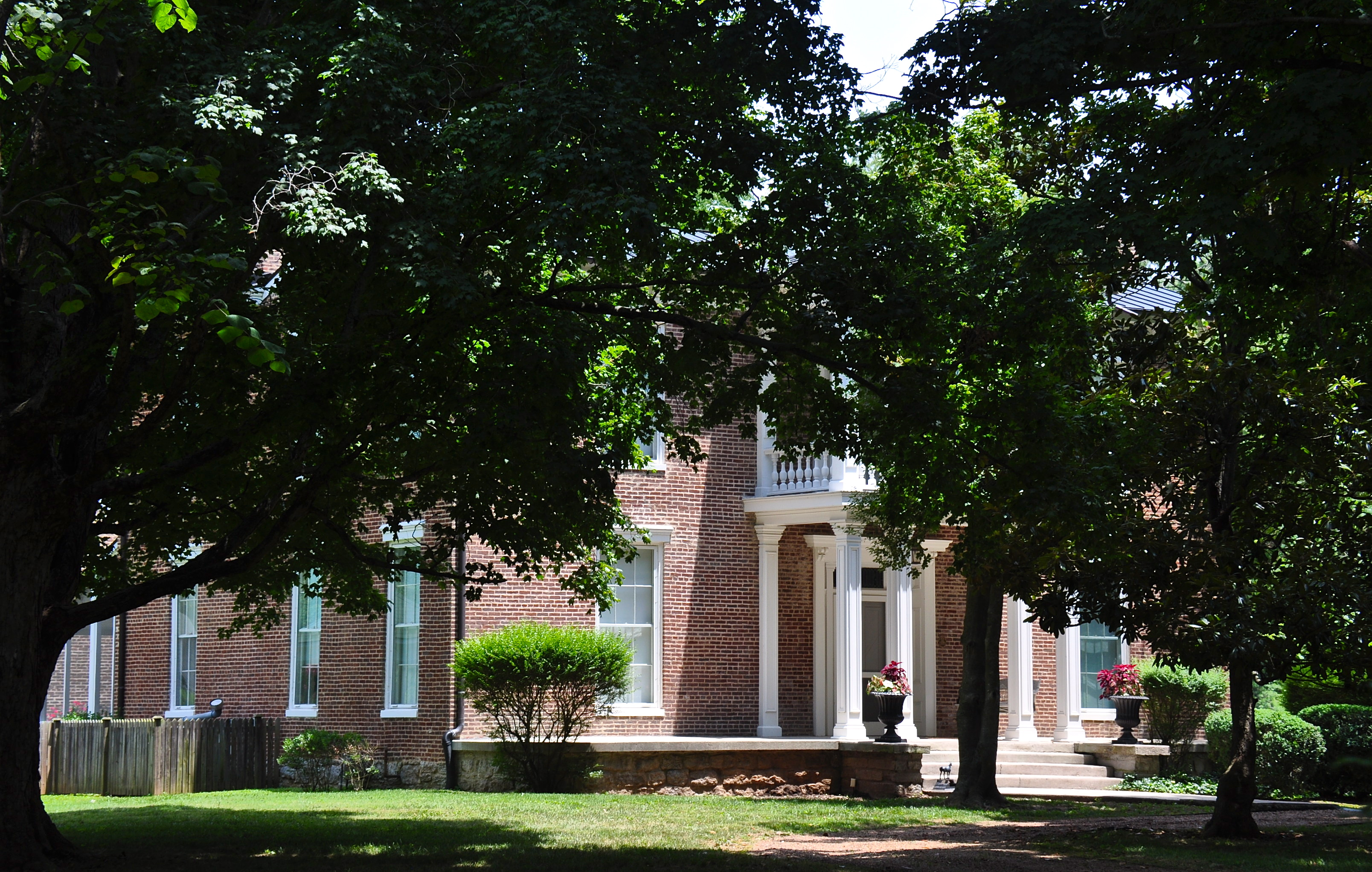
- Idler's Retreat in 2014

- Location within Tennessee Location within the United States
- Location: 112 Oak Street, Smyrna, Tennessee
- Coordinates: 35°59′15″N 86°30′55″W
- Area: 1.3 acres (0.53 ha)
- Built: 1865
- Architectural style: Greek Revival, Italianate
- NRHP reference No.: 04000475
- Added to NRHP: May 19, 2004

Idler's Retreat, also known as the Dillon-Tucker-Cheney House, is a historic house in Smyrna, Tennessee, U.S.. It was built circa 1865 by J. D. Dillon. In 1882, it was purchased by John F. Tucker, and renamed Tucker Place. It was designed in the Greek Revival and Italianate architectural styles. By the 1940s, it was inherited by Brainard Cheney's wife. The couple entertained other writers like Robert Penn Warren, Caroline Gordon, Flannery O'Connor and Allen Tate. The house was later inherited by Roy Neel, who served as the chief of staff to Vice President Al Gore. It has been listed on the National Register of Historic Places since May 19, 2004.
