= Ode to the Confederate Dead =

1927 poem by Allen Tate

"Ode to the Confederate Dead" is a long poem by the American poet-critic Allen Tate. It was first published in The American Caravan: A Yearbook of American Literature in 1927, and then collected in Tate's first book of poems, Mr. Pope and Other Poems, in 1928. It is one of Tate's best-known poems and considered by some critics to be his most important. Heavily influenced by the work of T. S. Eliot, this Modernist poem takes place in a graveyard in the South where the narrator grieves the loss of the Confederate soldiers buried there. However, unlike the "ode" to the Confederate dead written by the 19th-century American poet Henry Timrod, Tate's "Ode" is not a straightforward ode. Instead, Tate uses the graveyard and the dead Confederate soldiers as a metaphor for his narrator's troubled state of mind, and the poem charts the narrator's dark stream of consciousness, as he contemplates (or tries to avoid contemplating) his own mortality.

== Influence ==
Robert Lowell's poem "For the Union Dead" referred to, and was partly a response to, Tate's "Ode to the Confederate Dead".
