= Lyle H. Lanier =

American writer (1903–1988)

- Born: Lyle Hicks Lanier; January 11, 1903; Madison County, Tennessee, U.S.
- Died: December 30, 1988 (aged 85); Phoenix, Arizona, U.S.
- Education: Vanderbilt University; Peabody College
- Occupations: Psychologist, writer
- Employer(s): Vanderbilt University; University of Illinois; American Council of Education
- Title: Dr
- Children: 1 son, 1 daughter

Lyle H. Lanier (January 11, 1903 – December 30, 1988) was an American experimental psychologist and writer.

As a faculty member at Vanderbilt University from 1929 to 1938, Lanier published research comparing the mental abilities of whites and blacks, alleging whites were superior. A member of the Southern Agrarians, he was a contributor to I'll Take My Stand: The South and the Agrarian Tradition.

In the 1940s, Lanier was chair of the Department of Psychology at Vassar College, where he showed that the pain threshold depended on specific individuals. In 1947, he served as the Executive Director of the Committee on Human Resources of the United States Department of Defense.

Later, Lanier was chair of the Department of Psychology at New York University and the University of Illinois at Urbana–Champaign (UI), followed by vice president and provost at UI. He ended his career as the Director of Administrative Affairs and Educational Statistics for the American Council of Education, and retired in Phoenix, Arizona.

== Early life ==
Lyle Hicks Lanier was born on January 11, 1903, in Madison County, Tennessee.

Lanier was educated in public schools and attended prep school at Valparaiso University in Indiana. He attended Vanderbilt University from 1920 to 1923, where he graduated with a bachelor's degree in Philosophy. One of his professors, Herbert Charles Sanborn, who was the Chair of Psychology Department at Vanderbilt University, recommended him to work with Professor Joseph Peterson, a scholar in race psychology at Peabody College, then a separate college across the street from Vanderbilt University. As a result, Lanier received an MA in 1924 and a PhD in 1926 from Peabody College.

== Academic career ==
Lanier was an experimental psychologist. He became a faculty member at his alma mater, Vanderbilt University, in 1929, where he taught psychology until 1938. During that time, he published scientific racism. As early as 1929, he gave a lecture to the International Congress of Psychology suggesting whites and black varied "markedly in mental ability". Meanwhile, in his 1929 Studies in the Comparative Abilities of Whites and Negroes, co-authored with Joseph Peterson, Lanier tested the mental abilities of whites versus blacks. They concluded that "the whites were superior" due to "hereditary differences." Moreover, they added that whites finished their tests more quickly; they concluded this was due to "cultural factors." A review published in the American Journal of Sociology in 1930 suggested, "the results show enormous and statistically reliable superiority of whites over Negroes." [sic] However, in a review for the American Journal of Psychology, Otto Klineberg argued that based on their evidence, he came to a "totally different" interpretation. He stressed the role of environment in mental abilities, as New York City blacks tested higher than Southern blacks. Nevertheless, he added that the study offered "a number of other interesting results which would merit serious discussion." Moreover, in 1937, another psychologist named J. P. Foley agreed that the environment was the salient factor, not race. Two years later, in 1939, Lanier responded to Foley and persisted that his views were not "antiquated."

From 1932 to 1936, Lanier served as secretary/treasurer of the Southern Society for Philosophy and Psychology. In 1934, with Vanderbilt colleague Beverly Douglas, he gave a talk to the society about research they conducted on remaining sensations for victims of accidents who have lost an organ. By 1937, Lanier served as the president of the Southern Society.

At Vanderbilt, Lanier also became a Southern Agrarian and contributed an essay entitled 'A Critique of the Philosophy of Progress' to the volume I'll Take My Stand: The South and the Agrarian Tradition. In his essay, he suggested that community could only occur in "the agrarian community and in the villages and towns which are its adjunct", thus in rural America. He went on to stress the need of a "stable population," thus rejecting immigration, and the family as "the natural biological group, the normal milieu of shared experiences, community of interests, integration of personality." For Paul Lauter, a Professor of American Studies at Trinity College, Lanier created a "familiar binary" between "industrial capitalism: the city, the artificial, the mechanical, cosmopolitan, Jewish, liberal, and new," including the "terrifying ghost" of "communism", and "the agrarian: natural, traditional, harmonious, balanced, patriarchal, settled--like the medieval world." In a letter to Lula Ulrica Whitaker, a master's student who was writing a thesis on the Southern Agrarians, he stressed the need to stress "private enterprise" over "corporate enterprise". Meanwhile, in a 1936 essay entitled, 'Big Business in the Property State' published in Who Owns America: A New Declaration of Independence, an anthology co-edited by Allen Tate and Herbert Agar, Lanier argued against the definition of a corporation as an individual. He was also in favour of collective bargaining. Indeed, he was in favour of the decentralization of power through widespread small ownership.

From 1938 to 1948, Lanier served as the chair of the Department of Psychology at Vassar College. He served as the treasurer of the Eastern Psychological Association from 1941 to 1947. During that time, he conducted research on fifteen college girls, coming to the conclusion that the level of electric current to inflict pain depended on the specific individual: some felt more pain than others.

In 1947, Lanier took a leave of absence from Vassar College and served as the executive director of the Committee on Human Resources of the United States Department of Defense. A year later, in 1948, he became the chairman of the Department of Psychology at New York University. Additionally, he served as Secretary of the Society of Experimental Psychologists from 1948 to 1951.

Lanier was a professor and head of the Department of Psychology at the University of Illinois at Urbana–Champaign from 1950 to 1958, and as the Dean of its College of Liberal Arts and Sciences from 1959 to 1960. He entered into a contract with the Air Force Personnel Center to establish the Training Research Laboratory. As Dean, Lanier, alongside President David Dodds Henry, was held personally responsible for firing Leo Koch, an Assistant Professor of Biology who had written a public letter promoting premarital sex. However, in another letter, President Henry made it clear that Lanier agreed with him, not Koch.

Lanier went on to serve as Executive Vice-President and Provost of the University of Illinois from 1960 to 1972. In 1962, as provost, he imposed a strict no-cheating policy, and asked professors to report any instances of cheating during exams. Meanwhile, in 1963, he approved of the arrest of a Christian evangelist on campus due to regulations. In 1967, he suggested basing freshman acceptance bids on psychology tests rather than high school grades. Upon his retirement in 1972, he was replaced by John E. Corbally, Jr.

In 1972, Lanier became the Director of Administrative Affairs and Educational Statistics for the American Council of Education in Washington, D.C. In 1975, he co-authored a book on the financial state of American colleges and universities from 1972 to 1975 with Charles J. Andersen. He retired a year later, in 1976.

== Personal life ==
Lanier married the daughter of William L. Nichol, a "general freight agent" for the Nashville, Chattanooga and St. Louis Railway. They had a son, Lyle Lanier, Jr., and a daughter, Catherine (Lanier) Lemon, who married L. Gene Lemon.

== Death and legacy ==
He died on December 30, 1988, at his retirement home in Phoenix, Arizona. The annual Lanier Lecture at the University of Illinois was established in his honor by his daughter and his son. In 2015, it was given by Professor Emanuel Donchin.

== Works ==
- Race Differences in Three Non-linguistic Tests (Nashville, Tennessee: George Peabody College for Teachers, 1924).
- Studies in the comparative abilities of whites and Negroes (co-authored with Joseph Peterson; Philadelphia, Pennsylvania: Williams & Wilkins, 1929).
- I'll Take My Stand: The South and the Agrarian Tradition (co-authored with Donald Davidson, John Gould Fletcher, Henry Blue Kline, Stark Young, Allen Tate, Andrew Nelson Lytle, Herman Clarence Nixon, Frank Lawrence Owsley, John Crowe Ransom, John Donald Wade, and Robert Penn Warren, Baton Rouge, Louisiana: Louisiana State University Press1930).
- A study of the financial condition of colleges and universities: 1972-1975 (co-authored with Charles J. Andersen, Washington, D.C.: American Council on Education, 1975).
