= Richmond C. Beatty =

Richmond Croom Beatty
- Born: January 6, 1905; Shawnee, Oklahoma, U.S.
- Died: October 9, 1961 (aged 56); Nashville, Tennessee, U.S.
- Resting place: Calvary Cemetery, Nashville, Tennessee, U.S.
- Education: Birmingham-Southern College; Vanderbilt University
- Occupations: Academic, biographer
- Spouse: Floy Ward
- Parent(s): William Henry Beatty; Caroline Barbour

Richmond C. Beatty (January 6, 1905 – October 9, 1961) was an American academic, biographer and critic. He was the author of several books.

== Early life ==
Richmond C. Beatty was born on January 6, 1905, in Shawnee, Oklahoma. He grew up in Birmingham, Alabama, where his father, William Henry Beatty, was a "cotton buyer." His mother was Caroline Barbour. He had a brother and two sisters.

Beatty graduated from Birmingham-Southern College, where he earned a bachelor's degree in 1926. He subsequently attended Vanderbilt University, where he earned a master's degree in 1928 and a PhD in 1930.

== Career ==
Beatty began his career as an English professor at Tennessee State Teachers College (later known as the University of Memphis) from 1930 to 1935. He was an assistant professor of English at the University of Alabama from 1935 to 1937. He was an associate professor of English and American Literature at Vanderbilt University from 1937 to 1946, when he became a full professor. He retired from academia in 1956, and he joined the staff of The Tennessean as the literary editor.

Beatty was the author of several books, including biographies. He was awarded a Guggenheim Fellowship in 1940. He was a member of the Modern Language Association.

== Personal life and death ==
Beatty married Floy Ward in 1927. They resided at 3627 Hoods Hill Road in the Green Hills neighborhood of Nashville. He survived throat cancer in 1956.

Beatty died on October 9, 1961, at his Nashville residence, and he was buried in the Calvary Cemetery in Nashville.

== Selected works ==
- William Byrd of Westover. 1932.
- English Dramas. New York: W. W. Norton and Company. 1935. OCLC 971338057. (with Edd Winfield Parks)
- Bayard Taylor, Laureate of the Gilded Age. Norman, University of Oklahoma press. 1936.
- Lord Macaulay, Victorian Liberal. Norman, Oklahoma: University of Oklahoma Press. 1938. OCLC 252002434.
- James Russell Lowell. Nashville, Tennessee: Vanderbilt University Press. 1942. OCLC 776378468.
- The Literature of the South. Glenview, Illinois: Scott, Foresman and Company. 1952. (co-editor with Floyd C. Watkins and Thomas Daniel Young)
- The American Tradition in Literature. New York: W. W. Norton & Co. 1961. (co-editor with Sculley Bradley and E. Hudson Long)
