= Frances Neel Cheney =

American Librarian, professor, and author (1906 – 1996)

- Born: Frances Neel; August 19, 1906; Washington, D.C., United States
- Died: May 5, 1996 (aged 89)
- Other name: Fanny Cheney
- Education: Vanderbilt University, BA; George Peabody College for Teachers, BS; Columbia University, MA
- Occupations: Librarian; professor; author
- Spouse: Brainard Cheney (m. 1928)

Frances Neel Cheney (August 19, 1906 – May 5, 1996) was an American librarian, professor, and prolific reviewer of reference books. She graduated from Vanderbilt University and served in a number of professional positions at the school, including as an instructor at the Peabody Library School. She also worked for the Library of Congress and the Japan Library School at Keio University. She is best known as the author of the "Current Reference Books" column in the Wilson Library Bulletin, which she wrote for thirty years, as well as for her textbook, Fundamental Reference Sources, that became a standard in the field. She is remembered as one of the foremost reviewers of reference books and a significant figure in the history of reference instruction.

== Early life and education ==
Frances Neel Cheney was born on August 19, 1906 in Washington, D.C. to Thomas Meeks Neel, a mechanical engineer, and Carrie Tucker Neel, the niece of the confederate soldier, Sam Davis. The family moved frequently: first to Fitzgerald, Georgia from 1911 to 1913, then to Pittsburgh for the next six years where Cheney attended Wilkinsburg Public Schools, and finally to Newberry, South Carolina, her father's birthplace, where she attended high school. Cheney's father had an unsuccessful career in agriculture and died of pneumonia in February 1927.

Cheney enrolled in Vanderbilt University, her father's alma mater, in the fall of 1924, with the intention to study social work. She managed the Tri-Delt sorority house. At Vanderbilt, Cheney studied under Donald Davidson and John Crowe Ransom, members of the Fugitives literary movement. Ultimately, however, she graduated with her BA in sociology in 1928.

During her junior year, she met her future husband, Brainard Cheney, who was then a young reporter for the Nashville Banner. The two married on June 21, 1928, one week after graduation.

== Career ==
=== Early career and graduate studies ===
Cheney's library career began during her sophomore year at Vanderbilt as a part-time student assistant at the main library in Kirkland Hall. After graduating, she worked in a series of librarian positions at Vanderbilt: in the Chemistry Library in 1928, the Circulation Department in 1929, and finally the Reference Department in 1930, where she remained for the next seven years. During this time, she studied part-time at George Peabody College for Teachers and received her Bachelor of Science degree in library science from in 1934. She also took graduate courses in history, Latin paleography, and English literature.

After briefly studying college and university library administration at the University of Chicago in the summer of 1936, she became the head reference librarian for the Joint University Libraries (JUL) which served Vanderbilt, George Peabody College, and Scarritt College for Christian Workers.

She completed her graduate education at Columbia University School of Library Service earning the Masters of Science in library science in 1940.

In 1943, Cheney served as assistant to the Chair of Poetry in the Library of Congress, Allen Tate. Together, they published the bibliography Sixty American Poets, 1896-1944. She remained at the library of congress for another year as a bibliographer in the General Reference and Bibliography Division. In 1946, she returned to her position at the Joint University Libraries in Nashville.

=== Library instruction ===
In 1946, Cheney was hired as an assistant professor at the Peabody Library School of the George Peabody College for Teachers. She served as the school's associate director beginning in 1960 until her retirement in 1975 as professor emeritus.

In 1951, Cheney was one of five librarians recruited by Robert Gitler to help start the first library school at a Japanese university. She taught for a year at the newly-founded Japan Library School at Keio University in Tokyo. While there, she helped compile An Annotated List of Selected Japanese Reference Materials with Yukiko Monji.

=== Reviewer of reference books ===
Succeeding Louis Shores, Cheney contributed for the Wilson Library Bulletin as a reviewer of reference books from 1942 to 1972, writing the "Current Reference Books" column. To commemorate her thirty years of contributions, the Bulletin published a compilation of accolades from her peers and dubbed her the "Profession's Number-One Reference Reviewer". She went on to review reference books for Reference Services Review and American Reference Books Annual. John David Marshall, who compiled a bibliography of Cheney's work in 1983, put her total at nearly 8000 reference books reviewed across all three publications. A 1986 article in American Libraries estimated that she had written over 10,000 reviews.

In 1971, Cheney published Fundamental Reference Sources, a popular textbook for reference instruction. She coauthored a second edition in 1980 with Wiley J. Williams.

== Personal life and politics ==
Cheney and her husband, the novelist Brainard Cheney, maintained close friendships with many prominent figures of literature from the South, including Allen Tate, Caroline Gordon, Robert Penn Warren, and Flannery O'Connor. They were close with members of two Southern movements: the Fugitives and the Agrarians. According to biographers Dodge and Richardson, "Although the relationships between the Cheneys and the members of the Fugitives and the Agrarians was one of mutual influence, Cheney was not well known for her involvement in political controversy." Wiley J Williams, a colleague and friend of Cheney, noted that while the Cheneys were "radically conservative," many of their views differed from those of their more controversial friends, including their early acceptance of integration and their maintaining close associations with people from many different ethnic backgrounds.

== Death and legacy ==
Frances Neel Cheney died on May 5, 1996 in Nashville. She had no children.

Her work influenced figures in library science including William Katz, who claimed he "learned everything I know from Cheney, and a bit from [Louis] Shores." John V. Richardson lists Cheney's reference textbook, Fundamental Reference Sources; along with those by James Wyer, Louis Shores, Margaret Hutchins, and William Katz; as one of the standard texts in the history of reference education up to 1980.

She was the subject of a Festshrift edited by Edwin S. Gleaves and John Mark Tucker in 1983.

== Selected Publications ==
Cheney contributed 30 years of columns plus additional reviews to Reference Services Review, American Reference Books Annual and Wilson Library Bulletin. A complete bibliography of her over 10,000 reviews appears in:

- Marshall, John David (1983). "FNC in Print: A Bibliography of Works by and about Frances Neel Cheney". In Gleaves, Edwin S.; Tucker, John Mark (eds.). Reference services and library education: essays in honor of Frances Neel Cheney. Lexington, Mass.: Lexington Books. pp. 267–291. ISBN 0-669-05320-1.
- Tate, Allen (1983). Brown, Ashley; Cheney, Frances Neel (eds.). The poetry reviews of Allen Tate, 1924-1944. Baton Rouge: Louisiana State University Press.
- Cheney, Frances Neel; Williams, Wiley J. (1980). Fundamental reference sources (2nd ed.). Chicago: American Library Association.
- Cheney, Frances Neel (1971). Fundamental reference sources. Chicago: American Library Association. pp. x, 318. ISBN 0-8389-0081-X.
- Published for the Southeastern Library Association.Cheney, Frances Neel (1978). "Introduction". In Howell, J. B. (ed.). Special Collections in Libraries of the Southeast. Jackson, Miss.: Howick House.
- Cheney, Frances Neel (1954). "Books and Reading in the Modern World". Great Human Issues of Our Times. Nashville: Bureau of Publications, George Peabody College for Teachers.
- Tate, Allen (1945). Sixty American poets, 1896-1944. Selected, with preface and critical notes by Allen Tate. A preliminary check list by Frances Neel Cheney. Washington, D.C.: Library of Congress, General Reference and Bibliography Division.
- Cheney, Frances Neel; Monji, Yukiko (1952). An annotated list of selected Japanese reference materials. Tokyo: Japan Library School, Faculty of Literature, Keio Gijuku University.

== Memberships and honors ==
=== Leadership ===
- 1946-1947: president, Tennessee Library Association
- 1956–1961: served on Executive Board, American Library Association (ALA)
- 1956–1957: president, Association of American Library Schools
- 1960–1961: president, Reference Service Division, ALA
- 1960–1962: president, Southeastern Library Association
- 1960–1962: president, Beta Phi Mu
- 1964–1965: president, Library Education Division, ALA

=== Awards ===
- 1959: Good Teaching Award, Beta Phi Mu
- 1962: Isadore Gilbert Mudge Citation for Distinguished Contributions to Reference Librarianship, ALA
- 1966: honorary Doctor of Letters (D.Litt.), Marquette University
- 1970: named first Outstanding Reference Librarian of the Year by the Southeastern Library Association
- 1971: Henry H. Hill Award for Excellence in Teaching, George Peabody College for Teachers
- 1972: Frances Neel Cheney Scholarship Fund is established at George Peabody College for Teachers
- 1976: awarded honorary life membership in the Southeastern Library Association
- 1976: Constance Lindsay Skinner Award, Women's National Book Association
- 1978: Honorary Membership, ALA
- 1980: Mary Utopia Rothrock Award, Southeastern library Association
- 1992: Louis Shores–Oryx Press Award, Reference and Adult Services Division, ALA
