= Plain Folk of the Old South =

1949 book by Frank Lawrence Owsley

- Title page for Plain Folk of the Old South (1949)
- Author: Frank Lawrence Owsley
- Language: English
- Genre: Non-fiction
- Publication date: 1949

Plain Folk of the Old South is a 1949 book by American Vanderbilt University historian Frank Lawrence Owsley, one of the Southern Agrarians. In it he used statistical data to analyze the makeup of Southern United States of America society, contending that yeoman farmers made up a larger middle class than was generally thought.

== Historical perspectives ==
Historians have long debated the social, economic, and political roles of Southern classes. Terms used by scholars for the self-sufficient farmers at the middle economic level include "common people" and "yeomen." At the lowest level were the struggling poor whites, known disparagingly in some areas of the South as "Crackers."

In the colonial and antebellum years, subsistence farmers tended to settle in the back country and uplands. They generally did not raise commodity crops and owned few or no slaves. Jeffersonian and Jacksonian Democrats favored the term "yeoman" for a land-owning farmer. It emphasized an independent political spirit and economic self-reliance.

=== Views of Olmsted, Dodd, and Phillips ===
Northerners such as Frederick Law Olmsted, who traveled in and wrote about the 1850s South, through the early 20th-century historians such as William E. Dodd and Ulrich B. Phillips, assessed common southerners as minor players in the antebellum social, economic, and political life of the South.

Twentieth-century romantic portrayals of the antebellum South, such as Margaret Mitchell's novel Gone with the Wind (1936) and the 1939 film adaptation, mostly ignored the yeomen. The nostalgic view of the South emphasized the elite planter class of wealth and refinement, controlling large plantations and numerous slaves.

Novelist Erskine Caldwell's Tobacco Road portrayed the degraded condition of impoverished whites dwelling beyond the great plantations.

=== Frank Lawrence Owsley ===
The major challenge to the view of planter dominance came from historian Frank Lawrence Owsley in Plain Folk of the Old South (1949). His work ignited a long historiographical debate. Owsley started with the work of Daniel R. Hundley, who in 1860 had defined the southern middle class as "farmers, planters, traders, storekeepers, artisans, mechanics, a few manufacturers, a goodly number of country school teachers, and a host of half-fledged country lawyers, doctors, parsons, and the like". To find these people, Owsley turned to the name-by-name files on the manuscript federal census. Using their own newly invented codes, the Owsleys created databases from the manuscript federal census returns, tax and trial records, and local government documents and wills. They gathered data on all southerners. Historian Vernon Burton described Owsley's Plain Folk of the Old South, as "one of the most influential works on southern history ever written".

Plain Folk argued that southern society was not dominated by planter aristocrats, but that yeoman farmers played a significant role in it. The religion, language, and culture of these common people created a democratic "plain folk" society. Critics say Owsley overemphasized the size of the southern landholding middle class, while excluding the large class of poor whites who owned neither land nor slaves. Owsley believed that shared economic interests united southern farmers; critics suggest the vast difference in economic classes between the elite and subsistence farmers meant they did not have the same values or outlook.

=== Recent scholarship ===
In his study of Edgefield County, South Carolina, Orville Vernon Burton classified white society into the poor, the yeoman middle class, and the elite. A clear line demarcated the elite, but according to Burton, the line between poor and yeoman was less distinct. Stephanie McCurry argues that yeomen were clearly distinguished from poor whites by their ownership of land (real property). Yeomen were "self-working farmers", distinct from the elite because they physically labored on their land alongside any slaves they owned. Planters with numerous slaves had work that was essentially managerial, and often they supervised an overseer rather than the slaves themselves.

Wetherington (2005) argues the plain folk (of Georgia) supported secession to defend their families, homes, and notions of white liberty. During the war, the established patriarchy continued to control the home front and kept it functioning, even though growing numbers of plain folk joined the new wartime poor. Wetherington suggests that their localism and racism dovetailed with a republican ideology founded on Jeffersonian notions of an "economically independent yeomanry sharing common interests". Plain folk during the war raised subsistence crops and vegetables and relied on a free and open range to hunt hogs. Examples of these conditions can be seen in the award-winning novel Cold Mountain.

Before the war, they became more active in the cotton and slave markets, but plain folk remained unwilling to jeopardize their self-sufficiency and the stability of their neighborhoods for the economic interests of planters. The soldiers had their own reasons for fighting. First and foremost, they sought to protect hearth and home from Yankee threats. White supremacy and masculinity depended on slavery, which Lincoln's Republicans threatened. Plain-folk concepts of masculinity explain why so many men enlisted: they wanted to be worthy of the privileges of men, including the affections of female patriots. By March 1862, the piney woods region of Georgia had a 60% enlistment rate, comparable to that found in planter areas.

As the war dragged on, hardship became a way of life. Wetherington reports that enough men remained home to preserve the paternalistic social order, but there were too few to prevent mounting deprivation. Wartime shortages increased the economic divide between planters and yeoman farmers; nevertheless, some planters took seriously their paternalistic obligations by selling their corn to plain folk at the official Confederate rate "out of a spirit of patriotism." Wetherington's argument weakens other scholars' suggestions that class conflict led to Confederate defeat. More damaging to Confederate nationalism was the growing localism that grew, as areas had to fend for themselves as William Tecumseh Sherman's forces came nearer.

During Reconstruction Era after the war, plain folk split. Most supported the conservative (or Democratic Party) position, but some were "Scalawags" who supported the Republican Party.

== See also ==
- Culture of the Southern United States
- Jeffersonian democracy
- The Impending Crisis of the South, an 1857 anti-slavery critique by North Carolina writer Hinton Rowan Helper
- The National Grange of the Order of Patrons of Husbandry, a farmers organization founded in 1867 and still in operation
- Sharecropping, where the farmer does not own the land
- Yeoman, the independent farmer
