= Essays of Four Decades =

1967 essay collection by Allen Tate

- Author: Allen Tate
- Language: English
- Genre: essays
- Publisher: Swallow Press
- Publication date: February 21, 1967
- Publication place: United States
- Pages: 640

Essays of Four Decades is a 1967 essay collection by the American writer Allen Tate. It is divided into five sections. The first consists on texts about modern poetry in general. The second focuses on individual writers, including John Donne, Emily Dickinson, John Keats, W. B. Yeats, Hart Crane, Ezra Pound and Herbert Read. The third consists of essays about imagination and critical reception. The fourth is about the Southern United States. The fifth consists of prefaces to some of Tate's previous books.

== Contents ==
The book consists of the following texts.

I

- "The Man of Letters in the Modern World"
- "To Whom Is the Poet Responsible?"
- "Is Literary Criticism Possible?"
- "The Function of the Critical Quarterly"
- "Tension in Poetry"
- "Literature as Knowledge"
- "The Hovering Fly"
- "Techniques of Fiction"
- "Miss Emily and the Bibliographer"
- "Understanding Modern Poetry"
- "A Note on Critical 'Autotelism'"
- "Three Types of Poetry"
- "The Present Function of Criticism"
- "Modern Poetry"
- "Poetry Modern and Unmodern"

II

- "A Note on Donne"
- "The Point of Dying: Donne's 'Virtuous Men'"
- "A Note on Elizabethan Satire"
- "A Reading of Keats"
- "Emily Dickinson"
- "Yeats's Romanticism"
- "Hart Crane"
- "Crane: The Poet as Hero"
- "Hardy's Philosophic Metaphors"
- "Edwin Arlington Robinson"
- "John Peale Bishop"
- "MacLeish's Conquistador"
- "Ezra Pound"
- "Herbert Read"

III

- "Our Cousin, Mr. Poe"
- "The Angelic Imagination"
- "The Symbolic Imagination"
- "The Unilateral Imagination; Or, I, too, Dislike It"
- "T. S. Eliot's Ash Wednesday"
- "Longinus and the New Criticism"
- "Johnson on the Metaphysical Poets"
- "Ezra Pound and the Bollingen Prize"

IV

- "The Profession of Letters in the South"
- "The New Provincialism"
- "What Is a Traditional Society?"
- "Religion and the Old South"
- "A Southern Mode of the Imagination"
- "Narcissus as Narcissus"

V

Prefaces:

- To Reactionary Essays on Poetry and Ideas
- To Reason in Madness
- To On the Limits of Poetry
- To The Forlorn Demon
- To The Man of Letters in the Modern World
