= Grace DiSanto =

American poet

- Born: Grace Johanne DeMarco; 1924; Derby, Connecticut
- Died: June 4, 1993 (aged 68–69); Morganton, North Carolina
- Education: Belmont Abbey College
- Spouse: Frank M. DiSanto

Grace DiSanto (1924-1993) was an American journalist and poet based in North Carolina.

== Biography ==
She was born in Derby, Connecticut, in 1924 to Richard and Grace DeMarco. After moving to North Carolina in 1961, she graduated summa cum laude from Belmont Abbey College with a bachelor's degree in English. After college, she spent ten years working as a reporter, drama critic, and feature writer for the Australian Associated Press (New York City), the Ansonia Sentinel (Ansonia, Connecticut), and the Sunday Herald (New Haven, Connecticut).

DiSanto published over 180 poems in journals and anthologies, including Southern Poetry Review, Yale Literary Magazine, and New Voices II: An Anthology of Cape Fear Writers. Her first volume of poetry, The Eye is Single (1981), received the 1982 Oscar Arnold Young Memorial Award from the North Carolina Poetry Society. She also won several single-poem awards, including the 1982 Sam Ragan Poetry Prize for "At Grandfather Mountain II." She taught poetry at Western Piedmont Community College and was involved in the Poetry in the Schools program for Mecklenburg County, North Carolina. She was a member of the North Carolina Poetry Society, the Poetry Council of North Carolina, the New York Poetry Forum, and Centro Studie Scamb Internationale, Rome, Italy.

She married Frank M. DiSanto and had a son and two daughters. She died at her home in Morganton, North Carolina, on June 4, 1993, after a long illness. Her papers are on file at Western Piedmont Community College, and in the Southern Appalachian Writers Collection of the Asheville Art Museum, University of North Carolina. She corresponded with literary critic and poet M. Bernetta Quinn.
