= The Fathers (novel) =

1938 novel by Allen Tate

- Author: Allen Tate
- Language: English
- Publisher: G. P. Putnam's Sons
- Publication date: September 23, 1938
- Publication place: United States
- Pages: 306

The Fathers is a 1938 novel by the American writer Allen Tate. It was Tate's first and only novel. A revised edition with a new ending was published in 1977.

== Plot ==
The novel portrays the teenage boy Lacy Gore Buchan and his military family in rural Fairfax County, Virginia, before and at the start of the American Civil War. The Buchans interact with the Posey family in Georgetown and the impulsive George Posey, who is engaged to Lacy's sister Susan, against their father's will.

== Reception ==
The book received positive reviews but little commercial success. Kirkus Reviews wrote that Tate successfully used his experience from writing biographies and literary criticism to create a sense of authentic conflict and drama, portraying his characters' morals and loyalties with "vitality and robustness".

Jonathan Yardley of The Washington Post wrote in 2006 that the book was largely forgotten outside of university courses in Southern literature, which he called an injustice. He compared it favorably to Gone with the Wind, praised "its muscular prose and its exceptionally believable characters" and called it intricate but easy to read. The scholar John W. Crowley wrote in The Sewanee Review in 2011 that the novel benefits from repeated readings and that it had kept growing over the more than 40 years he had taught classes on it. He stressed the intertextual connections to The Good Soldier by Ford Madox Ford, which Tate openly was inspired by, and how Tate treated the American Civil War similarly to how Ford treated World War I.
