= Stonewall Jackson: The Good Soldier =

1928 book by Allen Tate

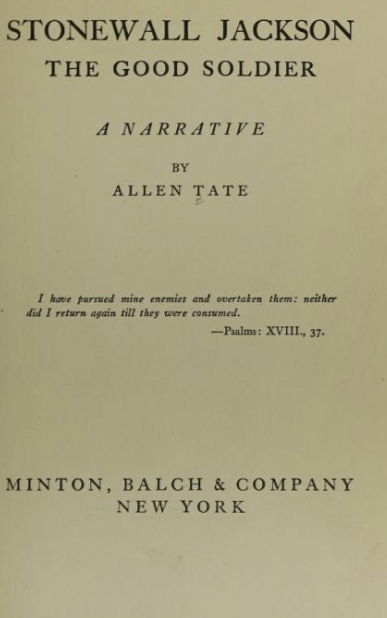
- Title page for Stonewall Jackson: The Good Soldier (1928)
- Author: Allen Tate
- Language: English
- Subject: Stonewall Jackson
- Genre: biography
- Publisher: Minton, Balch & Co.
- Publication date: 1928
- Publication place: United States
- Pages: 322

Stonewall Jackson: The Good Soldier is a biography about Stonewall Jackson, a Confederate general officer during the American Civil War. It was written by Allen Tate and published by Minton, Balch & Co. in 1928. The book takes a partisan stance for the Confederate States of America. The subtitle references the novel The Good Soldier by Ford Madox Ford.

The book is not annotated and Tate wrote in the preface that it mainly consists of paraphrases of other published works. His main sources were Battles and Leaders of the Civil War (1884), Memoirs of Stonewall Jackson (1891) by Mary Anna Jackson, Stonewall Jackson and the American Civil War (1898) by George Francis Robert Henderson and The Family and Early Life of Stonewall Jackson (1924) by Roy Bird Cook. The book was written hurriedly due to the deadline of the publishing contract. Tate was disappointed with the finished book, calling it a "little bread-and-butter opus". Tate said: "I wish I could get out an injunction against the reading of it by my friends—and an injunction to compel the General Public to read it."

The scholar Max Webb wrote that the book is a portrait of Tate as well as Jackson. Steve Davis called it "perhaps Tate's most staunchly pro-Southern work", and wrote that this may make it incomprehensible for some Northern readers.
