= Brainard Cheney =

American novelist (1900–1990)

- Born: June 3, 1900; Fitzgerald, Georgia, U.S.
- Died: January 15, 1990 (aged 89); Nashville, Tennessee, U.S.
- Education: Vanderbilt University
- Occupation: Author
- Spouse: Frances Neel Cheney

Brainard Cheney (June 3, 1900 – January 15, 1990) was an American novelist, playwright, speechwriter and essayist from Georgia who was associated with the Southern Agrarians literary movement

Cheney's writing career covered four decades. He published four novels — Lightwood (1939), River Rogue (1942), This Is Adam (1958), and Devil's Elbow (1969) — that depict the marring of Agrarian ideals by the social transformation of south Georgia between 1870 and 1960.

== Biography ==
Cheney was born in 1900 in Fitzgerald, Georgia, the son of Brainard Bartwell Cheney, a lawyer, and Mattie Cheney. In 1906. the family moved to Lumber City, Georgia. In 1908, when Cheney was age eight, his father died, leaving his mother to raise him and two sisters.

In 1917, Cheney entered The Citadel. In 1918, he enlisted in the U.S. military, but did not see any service in World War I, being discharged in 1919. In 1920, Cheney entered Vanderbilt University, but dropped out after the first year. He then worked for a few years as a school principal, bank clerk and manager of a timber camp. In 1924, Cheney attended the University of Georgia in the summer, then restarted at Vanderbilt, At Vanderbilt, Cheney becoming friends with many of the Fugitives poets and Agrarian writers at that school. He took courses under John Crowe Ransom and shared a room with Robert Penn Warren.

In 1925, Cheney left Vanderbilt to work at the Nashville Banner, where he stayed until 1940. During this early period, Cheney shared an apartment with the journalist Ralph McGill. While at the Nashville Banner, Cheney worked as a reporter, an editorialist, an editor and a feature writer. It was during this period that he started writing poems and other fiction pieces, In 1928, Cheney married Frances Neel, a reference librarian and a future professor at Peabody College. The couple moved into Idler's Retreat in Smyrna, Tennessee, an historic homestead owned by Frances' family. Over the following years, they frequently entertained Caroline Gordon and Allen Tate there. When the Cheneys converted to Roman Catholicism in 1953, Gordon and Tate were their sponsors.

In 1939, Cheney published his first novel, Lightwood. It deals with armed conflicts over timber rights in Dodge and Telfair Counties in Georgia from 1870 to 1923.

After leaving the newspaper in 1940, Cheney moved to Washington, D.C., when he worked as executive secretary for Senator Tom Stewart. After the 1941 Pearl Harbor attack, Cheney tried to reenlist in the military, but was rejected due to his age. That same year, he received a Guggenheim fellowship in 1941 to complete his second novel, River Rouge, published in 1942. The novel is about a young man in backwoods Georgia who works his way up in the timber industry to become a rich, though corrupt, merchant.

In 1943, Cheney received a staff job with a U.S. Senate subcommittee, working there until 1945. In February 1952, Cheney's play, Strangers in This World, premiered at the Vanderbilt University Theater in Nashville. In January 1956, it was staged at the Little Theater, University of Louisville, Belknap Campus.

In August 1952, Cheney wrote an appreciative review of Flannery O'Connor's first novel, Wise Blood. Obtaining Cheney's address from Caroline Gordon, O'Connor wrote Cheney to thank him for reviewing the book "so carefully and with so much understanding". In his reply, Cheney described himself to the Catholic O'Connor as "an ex-Protestant, ex-agnostic, who had just found his way back (after 10 or 12 generations) to The Church". The Cheneys visited O'Connor for the first time in June 1953. They became close friends, corresponding and sharing ideas until O'Connor's death in 1964.

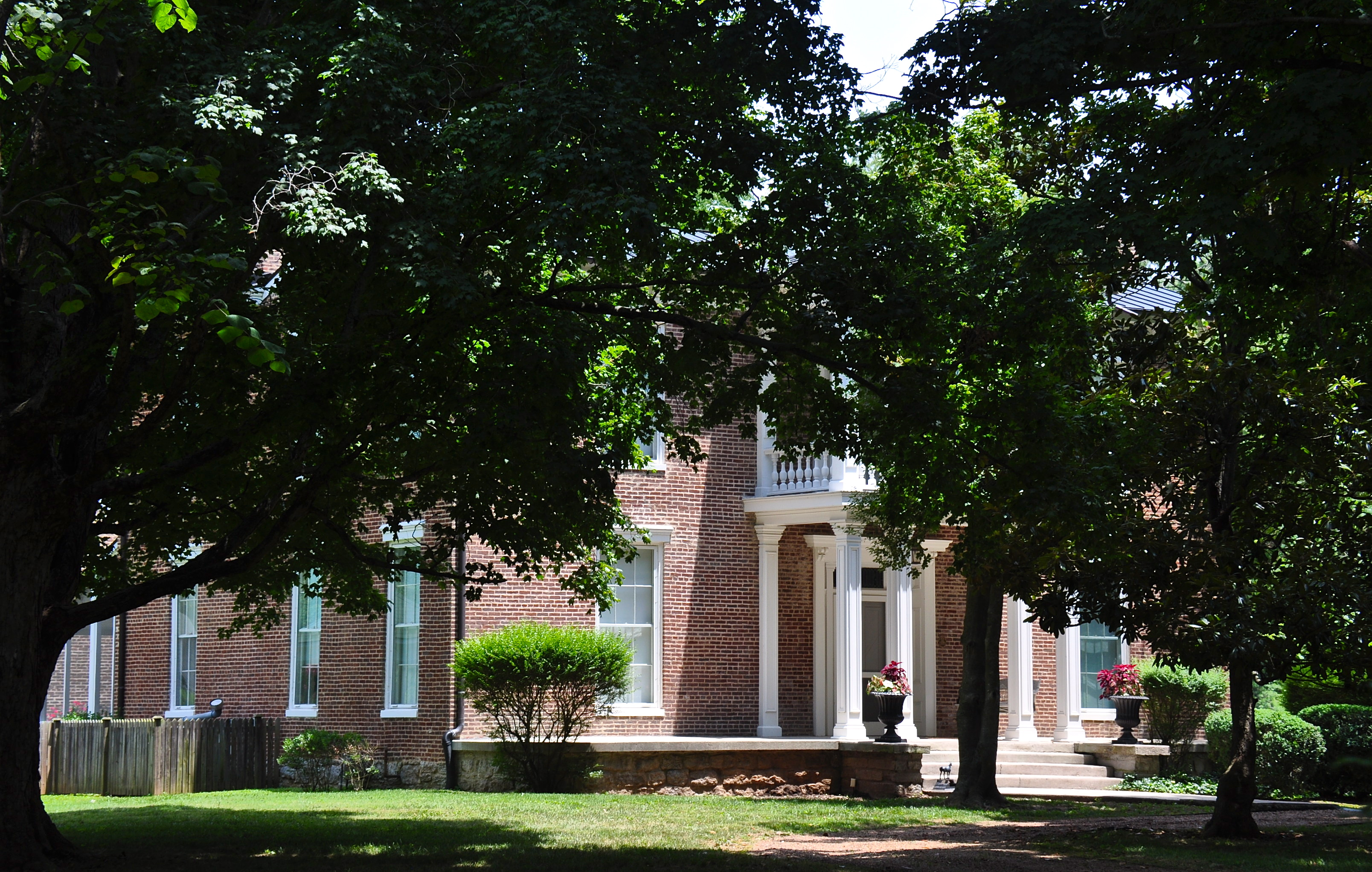
Idler's Retreat, the Cheneys' home in Smyrna, Tennessee.

In 1953, Cheney was hired as the public relations director for Tennessee governor Frank G. Clement. Cheney wrote Clement's speech for the 1956 Democratic National Convention ("How long oh Lord, how long..."). Cheney worked with Clement until 1958. That same year, Cheney published his third novel This is Adam. The Georgia Writers Association honored it as the best novel of 1958. He also assisted Warren with writing some speeches in Warren's novel, All the King's Men.

In November 1960, Cheney's play I Choose to Die premiered at the Vanderbilt University Theater. In 1965, he co-authored an essay on Teilhard de Chardin called "Has Teilhard de Chardin Really Joined the Within and Without of Things?", published in The Sewanee Review. In 1969, Cheney published his fourth novel, Devil's Elbow.

In 1982, Cheney returned to Georgia for the reprinting of his first two novels and to participate in the Altamaha R.A.F.T. (Restoring Altamaha Folk Traditions) festival. During the festival, Cheney, who had served as a raft-hand around 1917, piloted a reconstructed timber raft from Lumber city to the coast at Darien, Georgia.

Cheney died in Nashville in 1990 at age 89. Frances died in 1996, also at age 89.

== Legacy ==
Cheney's novels reveal his desire for a return to a simpler way of life, one founded on natural cycles and rooted in an appreciation of the land. His tragic characters often go astray by attempting to urbanize themselves or betray their own way of life. In his work, redemption can only be achieved by a return to a farm or a religious conversion, as in Devil's Elbow.

In 2011, The Lightwood Chronicles, being the true story of Brainard Cheney's novel, Lightwood, was published. The book includes a collection of essays and other information relating to the Dodge Timber Wars, divided into two sections: Lightwood as History and Lightwood as Fiction. The editor, Stephen Whigham, interviewed Cheney in 1982.

In 2011, MMJW BookHouse began republishing Cheney's novels. In 2016, MMJW BookHouse published a comprehensive biography of Cheney by Dr James E. Young, titled Brainard Cheney and The Search for a Hero: A Literary Biography of a Southern Novelist, Reporter, and Polemicist. Copies are available at Amazon and Barns and Noble.

In 2016, Cheney was inducted in the Georgia Writers Hall of Fame.

== Works ==
=== Novels ===
- Lightwood (1939). Boston: Houghton Mifflin Co.
- River Rogue (1942). Boston: Houghton Mifflin Co.
- This Is Adam (1958). New York: McDowell, Obolensky.
- Devil's Elbow (1969). New York: Crown Publishers.

=== Plays ===
- Strangers in This World (1951)
- I Choose to Die (1960)

=== Correspondence ===
- The Correspondence of Flannery O'Connor and the Brainard Cheneys (1986), ed. C. Ralph Stevens. Jackson, MS: University Press of Mississippi.
