= M. Bernetta Quinn =

Roman Catholic nun and author (1915–2003)

Sister M. Bernetta Quinn OSF

Personal life
- Born: Viola Roselyn Quinn; September 19, 1915 Lake Geneva, Wisconsin, U.S.
- Died: February 24, 2003 (aged 87) Rochester, Minnesota, U.S.

Religious life
- Religion: Catholic

Mary Bernetta Quinn OSF (born Viola Roselyn Quinn; September 19, 1915 – February 24, 2003) was an American Franciscan nun, literary critic, and correspondent with many of the most notable poets and writers of her era (see correspondence section below). The author of five books and many academic articles, she published on the Catholic Church's engagement with modernist poetry, particularly in works by Flannery O'Connor, Denise Levertov, Ezra Pound, Wallace Stevens, and Randall Jarrell, all of whom were among her many literary correspondents. She was a member of the Sisters of Saint Francis of Rochester, Minnesota.

== Early life and education ==
She was born Viola Roselyn Quinn in Lake Geneva, Wisconsin, on September 19, 1915, to Ellen M. Foran Quinn, a native of Ireland, and Bernard Franklin Quinn, a native of Wisconsin. In 1934, she entered the Franciscan Sisters of the Congregation of Our Lady of Lourdes at St. Francis Parish in Lake Geneva. She professed her first vows in 1937. She earned a bachelor's degree in English at the College of Saint Teresa in Winona, Minnesota, in 1942. In 1944, she earned an M.A. in English at the Catholic University of America in Washington, D.C.. In 1952, she defended her dissertation and earned a doctorate in English from the University of Wisconsin–Madison. Her dissertation was excerpted in The Sewanee Review. She also studied abroad, attending the International Yeats Summer School in Sligo, Ireland.

== Career ==
=== Teaching ===
Quinn began her teaching career in elementary and secondary schools in St. Priscilla Parish, Chicago, and Winona and Austin, Minnesota. In 1954, she joined the English department faculty of the College of Saint Teresa in Winona, Minnesota, remaining there until 1967. She had an interest in historically black colleges and universities, teaching at Allen University in South Carolina and Norfolk State University in Virginia. She also taught abroad at two Tokyo campuses, the University of the Sacred Heart and Meiji Gakuin University. She had visiting professorships at the Catholic University of America, the University at Buffalo, St. Andrews Presbyterian College in North Carolina (now St. Andrews University), and Siena College.

=== Poetry ===
Quinn wrote poetry all her life, and it began appearing in print in the 1940s. In 1949, she published "Explanation" in College English, and in 1959 she published "For Ruth Wallerstein Who Died in England, April 1958" there. Flannery O'Connor, a Catholic who attended daily Mass, spoke highly of "the Sister at Minneapolis that writes such good poetry". Quinn corresponded with O'Connor and her mother Regina. Quinn's poem, "Children Carrying Wood", appeared in Art Journal in 1962, and "In Branches of Spruce" in The Sewanee Review in 1963.

=== Books ===
She published five books, Motive and Method in the Cantos of Ezra Pound (with Hugh Kenner, Guy Davenport, and Forrest Reid) (Columbia University Press, 1953); The Metamorphic Tradition in Modern Poetry (1955), reviewed by such figures as R. W. B. Lewis, David Ferry, Austin Warren, and Hazard Adams; Give Me Souls: A Life of Raphael Cardinal Merry del Val (Newman Press 1958), reviewed in The New York Times; To God Alone the Glory: A Life of St. Bonaventure (1962); and Ezra Pound: An Introduction to the Poetry (Columbia Introductions to Twentieth-Century American Poetry, 1972). After her retirement, she published a poetry collection, --dancing in stillness (1983). She had residencies at Yaddo, the Bellagio Center (Rockefeller Foundation), and the MacDowell Colony, and received grants from the National Endowment for the Humanities and National Endowment for the Arts.

=== Correspondence with literary figures ===
She had significant letter-writing correspondences with major literary figures including Flannery O'Connor and her mother Regina; novelists Caroline Gordon, Doris Betts, Sylvia Wilkinson, Peter Taylor, Shelby Stephenson, Robie Macauley, and Robert Penn Warren; writer and painter Guy Davenport; the poets Denise Levertov, Gibbons Ruark, Grace DiSanto, Fred Chappell, James Laughlin, Robert Lowell, Robert Bly, Seamus Heaney, James Wright, Wallace Stevens, Richard Wilbur, and Allen Tate; the Italian-American poet and translator Mary de Rachewiltz (daughter of Ezra Pound), and violinist Olga Rudge (Pound's longtime companion); critic Frank Tuohy; and philosopher Donald Davidson. Her papers are in the Beinecke Rare Book and Manuscript Library at Yale University, and the Wilson Special Collections Library of UNC-Chapel Hill.

=== Literary criticism ===
She published articles in journals such as The Sewanee Review, PMLA, and The English Journal, often writing about figures she knew personally such as Denise Levertov, Flannery O'Connor, Wallace Stevens, William Carlos Williams, and Randall Jarrell.

== Retirement ==
In 1983, she retired to Assisi Heights in Rochester, Minnesota, and marked her Franciscan diamond jubilee in 1997. She died on February 24, 2003, leaving an unfinished draft of Pilgrimage to the Stars, a book for children about Dante's Divine Comedy, which is housed in UNC-Chapel Hill's special collections.
