= The Mediterranean (poem) =

"The Mediterranean" is a 1933 poem by the American writer Allen Tate.

== Summary ==
"The Mediterranean" is written from the perspective of an American in correspondence with a classical heritage, especially Virgil's Aeneid. The protagonist visits a vaguely Aeneidean setting at the Mediterranean Sea and ponders about himself, the mythic dimension of classical culture, and the United States.

== Analysis ==
The poem has an epitaph which is a modified version of a line from book I of the Aeneid, where Venus pleads with Jupiter for her son Aeneas and his men. The original quotation is Quem das finem, rex magne, laborum?, meaning "What end, great king, do you set to their ordeals?" In Tate's version, laborum (labor) has been replaced by dolorum (pain). According to Lillian Feder, this change was a way for Tate to say that modern man cannot really justify labor because he lacks a "heroic goal", and is left only with pain.

In The Kenyon Review, Vivienne Koch described the poem as "Coleridgean in form, and Arnoldian in symbolism". Robert Dupree wrote in The Southern Review that "The Mediterranean" stands out, together with "The Cross" and "The Last Days on Alice", as a poem where Tate explores "the difference between merely perceiving (erkennen) lifeless units and truly understanding (verstehen) vital forms".
