= Woodstock (Trenton, Kentucky) =

- U.S. National Register of Historic Places
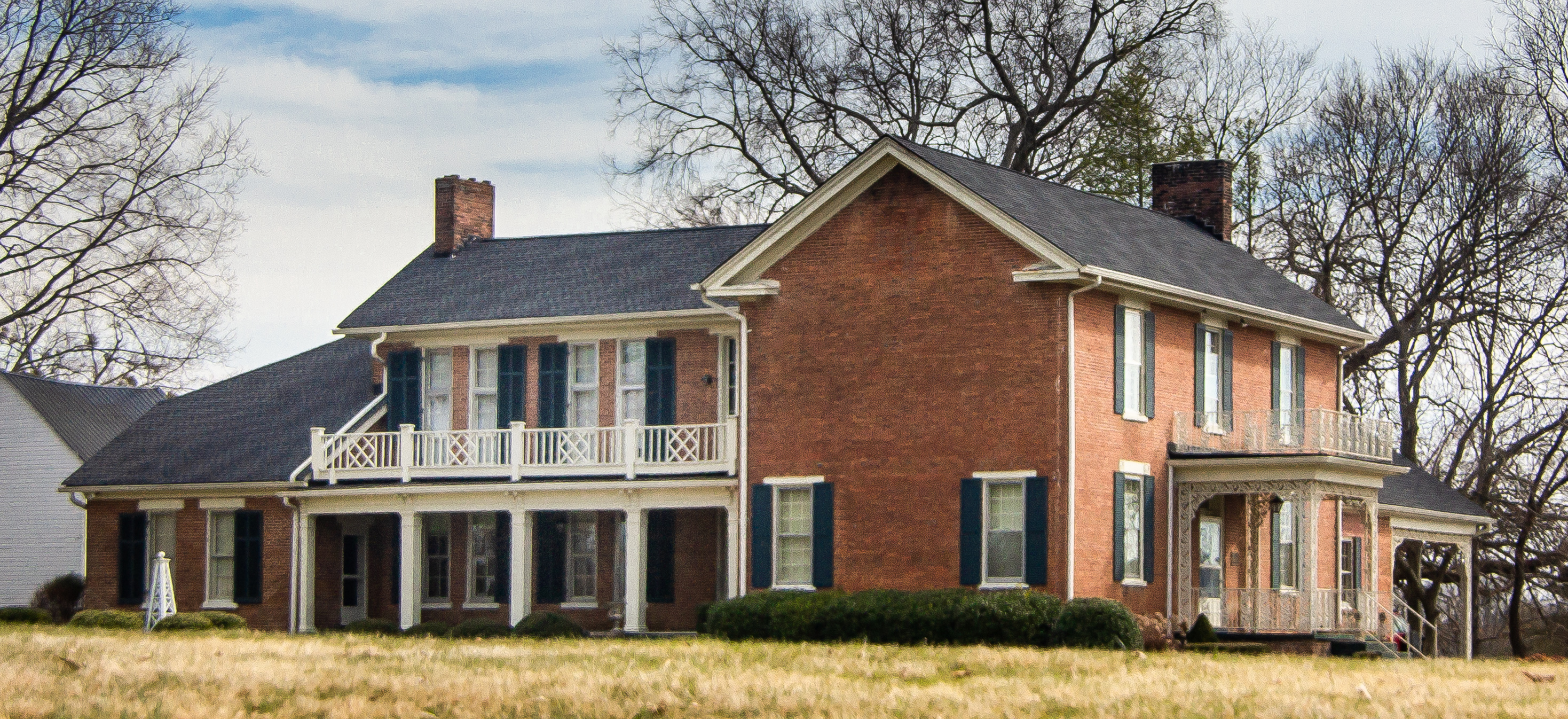

- Location within Kentucky Location within the United States
- Nearest city: Trenton, Kentucky
- Coordinates: 36.64441°N 87.31234°W
- Area: 7.4 acres (3.0 ha)
- Built: 1830
- Architectural style: Federal
- NRHP reference No.: 10000904
- Added to NRHP: November 10, 2010

Woodstock, located in Todd County, Kentucky near Trenton, Kentucky, was the center of a 3,000 acres (12 km^{2}) farm which extended across the state line into Montgomery County, Tennessee. Its main house was built in 1830. That and a second contributing building, a smokehouse, on 7.4 acres (3.0 ha) of land all in Todd County, was listed on the National Register of Historic Places in 2010.

The house was deemed significant for associations with three women: it was a home of the famous author Dorothy Dix (actually Elizabeth Meriwether Gilmer (1861–1951)) and is also associated with "two other interesting and important female members of the Meriwether family, Caroline Ferguson Gordon (1895–1981), and Caroline Meriwether Goodlett (1833–1914), who also gained national reputations in their respective fields."

Dorothy Dix wrote of it:

How can one describe the place in which one was born any more than one could paint for a stranger the portrait of one’s own mother? So much of childish impressions, when home was grander than any storied castle, goes into the picture, so much of love and loyalty, so many tender recollections, that it all becomes blurred in a golden haze of memory in which it is impossible to distinguish between reality and fancy. / So is Woodstock to me. The old home. The house that my grandfather built. In which my father was born and in which his gay and debonair young manhood was spent, and where my own baby feet, with those of many other little grandchildren, pattered across the floor. But before I try to tell you of it I must first sketch in a bit of background....

"Woodstock" was the name used for the farm from 1821 on. It stayed in the Meriwether family until 1918.

The main house has 7,400 square feet (0.069 ha) of floor area.

It is located about 6 miles (9.7 km) southwest of Trenton, and is just a few hundred yards north of the state line of Kentucky.

== History ==
In 1809, Dr. Charles Meriwether of Albemarle County, Virginia bought 13,000 acres of farmland in Montgomery County, Tennessee and Todd County, Kentucky at a price of $1 per acre. The doctor bequeathed a portion of the land to each of his three sons. His son Charles Nicholas Minor Meriwether inherited a portion of his father's land and built a mansion house on the land in 1830, which became Woodstock.
