= Frank Tuohy =

English writer and academic

John Francis Tuohy
- Born: John Francis Tuohy; May 2, 1925; Uckfield, Sussex, England
- Died: April 11, 1999; Shepton Mallet, Somerset, England
- Education: Stowe School; King's College, Cambridge
- Occupations: Writer; Academic
- Writing career
- Genres: Literary fiction; Short stories
- Notable work: The Ice Saints
- Notable awards: James Tait Black Memorial Prize; Geoffrey Faber Memorial Prize; E. M. Forster Award

John Francis ("Frank") Tuohy, (2 May 1925 – 11 April 1999) was an English writer and academic. Born in Uckfield, Sussex, he attended Stowe School and went on to read Moral Sciences and English at King's College, Cambridge. On completion of his studies, he worked in numerous academic posts under the auspices of the British Council. This included postings in Finland, Brazil and Poland. In the 1950s, in the British Council School of São Paulo, Brazil, he ran a memorable course on The War Poets (WWI), introducing Stephen Spender and his contemporaries. He taught English language and literature at the University of São Paulo. He corresponded with Catholic nun, literary critic and poet M. Bernetta Quinn. His posting in Poland provided his inspiration for his 1965 novel The Ice Saints. The book received considerable critical acclaim and was awarded the James Tait Black Memorial Prize. Tuohy died in Shepton Mallet, Somerset in 1999 at a time when he was working on the uncompleted manuscript for a new novel following many years of writer's block.

== Awards and distinctions ==
- Katherine Mansfield-Menton Prize (1959)
- James Tait Black Memorial Prize (1964)
- Geoffrey Faber Memorial Prize (1965)
- Fellow, Royal Society of Literature (1965)
- E. M. Forster Award (1972)
- Heinemann Award (1979)

== Works ==
- The Admiral and the Nuns with Other Stories. London, Macmillan, 1962; New York, Scribner, 1963.
- The Animal Game. London, Macmillan, and New York, Scribner, 1957.
- The Warm Nights of January. London, Macmillan, 1960.
- The Ice Saints. London, Macmillan, and New York, Scribner, 1964.
- Fingers in the Door. London, Macmillan, and New York, Scribner, 1970.
- Live Bait and Other Stories. London, Macmillan, 1978; New York, Holt Rinehart, 1979.
- The Collected Stories. London, Macmillan, and New York, HoltRinehart, 1984.
