= John Donald Wade =

American academic (1892–1963)

- Born: September 28, 1892; Marshallville, Georgia, U.S.
- Died: October 9, 1963 (aged 71); Marshallville, Georgia, U.S.
- Education: University of Georgia; Harvard University; Columbia University
- Occupation: Academic

John Donald Wade (September 28, 1892 – October 9, 1963) was an American biographer, author, essayist, and teacher.

== Early life ==
Wade was born in Marshallville, Georgia. His father was a country doctor who served as a surgeon in the Civil War. Wade was descended from the first governor of Georgia, John Adam Treutlen.

Wade received his bachelor's degree from the University of Georgia in 1914. While a student there, he was a member of the Phi Kappa Literary Society and was awarded Phi Beta Kappa. Wade later earned a master's degree from Harvard University in 1915. Since Harvard didn't have a concentration in American literature at that time, Wade completed his Doctorate at Columbia University in 1924, studying under Dr. Trent. He served in World War I.

== Career ==
Wade was a teacher at the University of Georgia between 1919 and 1926 where he was a key founder of the graduate program in American literature.

Wade developed an interest in biography and published Augustus Baldwin Longstreet: A Study in the Development of Culture in the South in 1925 and published a biography of Methodist Church leader John Wesley in 1930. His research for his Wesley biography was financed by a Guggenheim grant and took him to England to gather information. Wade researched and wrote 116 biographical sketches for the Dictionary of American Biography and served as an assistant editor for that work in 1927 and 1928.

By 1930 Wade was teaching at Vanderbilt University as a member of the English faculty and became involved with the Southern Agrarians. Wade is probably best remembered for his contribution to the Agrarian manifesto I'll Take My Stand, which was named by Wade and published that year. His contribution to the manifesto was "The Live and Death of Cousin Lucius," an exemplum of the Agrarian life. He also contributed to the Agrarian follow-up to "I"ll Take My Stand" with his essay "Of the Mean and Sure Estate."

He returned to the University of Georgia to be the head of the Department of Language and Literature, a position he held for many years.

In the 1930s and 1940s Wade wrote critical essays on Southern culture and biographical sketches of Southern literary and political figures that were published in learned journals such as the Virginia Quarterly. He also continued to support his agrarian ideals in his writing.

In 1941 he co-edited Masterworks of World Literature. In 1950 he retired from active teaching but continued to work as founding editor of The Georgia Review and was active in his local community, forming the Marshallville Foundation to foster his home town. He became a horticulturist and planted many gardens with plants from all over the world.

== Death ==
Wade died on October 9, 1963, in Marshallville.
