= None Shall Look Back =

1937 novel by Caroline Gordon

- Author: Caroline Gordon
- Working title: The Cup of Fury
- Language: English
- Publisher: Charles Scribner's Sons
- Publication date: 1937
- Publication place: United States
- Pages: 378

None Shall Look Back is a 1937 novel by the American author Caroline Gordon. It is set during the American Civil War and follows the career of Rivers Allard, a man from Kentucky who is enlisted in the Confederate States Army.

== Title ==
The title is from the Old Testament's Nahum 2.8: "But Nineveh is of old like a pool of water; yet they shall flee away. Stand! Stand! shall they cry, but none shall look back". Gordon's preferred title, which she selected before she began to write the book, was The Cup of Fury, which references Jeremiah 25.15: "For thus saith the Lord God of Israel unto me, Take the wine cup of this fury at my hand, and cause all the nations, to whom I send this, to drink it".

== Reception ==
Edith H. Walton reviewed the book in The New York Times when it came out, saying it was Gordon's most ambitious novel and that it makes it "obvious at once" that the author "has many assets in her favor". Anne M. Boyle calls it "a work of violent confrontation with a culture where traditional race and gender arrangements have been disrupted" and says it demonstrates "the bleakness of the modern patriarchal world and the helplessness of its untutored children".
