= Henry Blue Kline =

American journalist

Henry Blue Kline (1905–1951) was an American writer. He is perhaps best known for his contribution to the volume I'll Take My Stand: The South and the Agrarian Tradition, as a member of the Southern Agrarians.

Kline received an M.A. from Vanderbilt University in 1929. From 1930 to 1933, he taught at the University of Tennessee. He then worked for the Civil Works Administration and the Tennessee Valley Authority. From 1944 to 1949, he worked as a journalist for the St. Louis Post-Dispatch. He worked for the Atomic Energy Commission from 1949 until his death.
