= Frank Lawrence Owsley =

American historian (1890–1956)

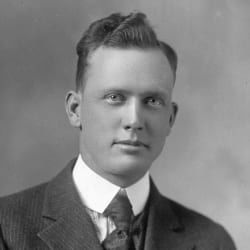
- Owsley c. 1927
- Born: January 20, 1890 near Montgomery, Alabama, U.S.
- Died: October 21, 1956 (aged 66); London, England
- Education: Auburn University; University of Chicago
- Occupation: Historian
- Employer(s): Vanderbilt University; University of Alabama
- Spouse: Harriet Chappell (m. 1920)

Frank Lawrence Owsley (January 20, 1890 – October 21, 1956) was an American historian who taught at Vanderbilt University for most of his career, where he specialized in Southern history and was a member of the Southern Agrarians. He is notorious for his essay "The Irrepressible Conflict" (1930) in which he lamented the economic loss of slavery for the defeated Confederacy and of the "half savage blacks" that had been freed. He is also known for his study of Confederate diplomacy based on the idea of "King Cotton" and especially his quantitative social history of the middling "plain people" of the Old South.

== Life and career ==
Born on his grandparents' farm near Montgomery, Alabama, Owsley graduated from the Fifth District Agricultural School (now Wetumpka High School) in Wetumpka. He then completed two degrees at the Alabama Polytechnic Institute (now Auburn University), a Bachelor of Science in 1911 and Master of Arts in 1912. From 1912 to 1919, Owsley worked as a teacher at public schools and the Alabama Polytechnic Institute. Owsley also began graduate studies in history at the University of Chicago under Professor William E. Dodd, completing a second master's degree in 1917 and doctorate in 1924. "Although he appreciated Dodd as a teacher and shared with him an intense enthusiasm for southern history, Owsley resented his mentor’s attacks upon the South’s antebellum aristocracy," wrote Fred Arthur Bailey for the Tennessee Encyclopedia.

From 1919 to 1920, Owsley taught history at Birmingham–Southern College. In 1920, Owsley married Harriet Chappell; they met at Birmingham–Southern.

=== Confederacy ===
Owsley argued in his dissertation State Rights in the Confederacy (1925) that the Confederacy "died of states' rights". Owsley held that during the Civil War, key Southern governors resisted the appeals of the Confederate government for soldiers. His book King Cotton Diplomacy: Foreign Relations of the Confederate States of America (1931) is the basic study of Confederate diplomacy. It emphasizes that Southerners before the war had a profound belief in the power of King Cotton to rule the industrial economy, so that Britain and France would enter the war on behalf of the Confederacy to get that cotton. The belief was not based on knowledge of Europe and failed in practice.

=== Southern Agrarians ===
As an active member of the Southern Agrarians group based in Nashville, Owsley contributed "The Irrepressible Conflict" to the manifesto I'll Take My Stand (1930). In this work, he described "half-savage blacks . . . some of whom could still remember the taste of human flesh and the bulk of them hardly three generations removed from cannibalism." He lashed out at the North for what he alleged were attempts to dominate the South spiritually and economically. In "Scottsboro, the Third Crusade: The Sequel to Abolition and Reconstruction" (the American Review [1933]: 257–85), he criticized northern race reformers as the "grandchildren of abolitionists and reconstructionists." He announced that the South was white man's country and that blacks must accommodate that reality. Serving as president of the Southern Historical Association in 1940, Owsley castigated the North for assuming its people and thinking represented the entire nation, and for violating what he called "the comity of section".

Owsley agreed with the other Southern Agrarians of the 1930s in espousing values which they saw being overtaken by the industrialism and modernism that had begun to influence the South. According to Owsley, the position of the South vis-à-vis the North was created not by slavery, the dominance of cotton and agriculture, or states' rights, but by the two regions' misunderstanding of each other.

=== Plain Folk of the Old South ===
After 1940, Frank and Harriet Owsley pioneered what came to be called the "new social history". They studied the historical demography of the South and social mobility and produced a history called Plain Folk of the Old South (1949). Historian Vernon Burton described it as "one of the most influential works on Southern history ever written." The Owsleys culled data from federal census returns, tax and trial records, and local government documents and wills. In Plain Folk, they argued that Southern society was not dominated by planter aristocrats, but that yeoman farmers played a significant role. The religion, language, and culture of white common people created a democratic "plain folk" society, Owsley argued.

Plain Folk of the Old South was an answer to liberal historians' emphasis on the dominance of the planter class's social and political control of the South. Owsley regarded the future of American civilization as dependent on the survival of southern regionalism and agrarian values. The book depicts a complex social structure in the South, one featuring a large middle class of yeoman farmers and not just wealthy planters and poor whites. He argues that the South was devoted to republican values generally and was not locked into race and slavery. Owsley believed the Civil War's causes were rooted in both North and South.

In rejecting the Lost Cause of the Confederacy and the New South's romantic legends, Owsley sought to uncover a "real" South, what he called the plain folk. He characterized the postwar South as made up of a broad class of yeoman farmers, between poor blacks, many of whom were sharecroppers in a kind of debt bondage, and poor whites at one end, and large plantation owners at the opposite end of the economic spectrum. Owsley asserted that the real South was liberal, American, and Jeffersonian, not radical or reactionary.

Critics suggested Owsley was a reactionary defender of the Confederacy who was attempting to rewrite the past to preserve white Southern culture, and that he overemphasized the size of the Southern landholding middle class, while excluding the large class of poor white southerners who owned neither land nor slaves. Further, they suggested Owsley's theory assumed that too much commonality in shared economic interests united Southern farmers, and asserted that he did not fully assess the vast difference between the planters' commercial agriculture and the yeoman's subsistence farming.

Biographer Priscilla Roberts argues that his work on Plain Folk of the Old South:

...suggested that the South’s middle-class yeomanry, the majority of whites in that section, enjoyed a relationship of mutual respect with the gentry and planters of the region and a common commitment to the South's existing socioeconomic system which united all of them. Increasingly vitriolic abolitionist attacks on slavery by northerners during the 1850s threatened the South’s identity and domestic independence, to the point that such "plain folk" felt that, in defending their section, they were defending the same liberties that the thirteen colonies had defended in 1776: a viewpoint with which Owsley clearly sympathized.

=== Vanderbilt University ===
At Vanderbilt University (1920–49), Owsley specialized in Southern history, especially the antebellum and Civil War eras. Directing nearly 40 Ph.D. dissertations, he was also a popular teacher of undergraduates. In 1949 he went to the University of Alabama to build its history program. Reacting to attacks by critics of Southern segregation, Owsley tried to refute what he saw as their misunderstanding of the true South. He regarded the future of American civilization as dependent on the survival of southern regionalism.

=== Later career ===
Owsley joined the University of Alabama faculty in 1949 as Chair of Southern History and headed its Department of History from 1952 to 1955. Afterward, he was a guest lecturer at several universities. In the summer of 1956, Owsley embarked on a journey to Europe, on a Fulbright Scholarship, to research in British and French archives, a task which he did not live to complete. However, Owsley died in London on October 21, 1956, of a heart attack.

== See also ==
- Plain Folk of the Old South
- Southern Agrarians

== Primary sources ==
- Owsley, Harriet Chappell and Owsley, Frank Lawrence. Frank Lawrence Owsley, Historian of the Old South. A Memoir with Letters and Writings of Frank Owsley (1990).

=== Books and articles by Owsley ===
- Owsley, Frank L. (1926). "Defeatism in the Confederacy". The North Carolina Historical Review. 3 (3): 446–456. JSTOR 23517135.
- Owsley, Frank Lawrence (1925). "Local Defense and the Overthrow of the Confederacy: A Study in State Rights". The Mississippi Valley Historical Review. 11 (4): 490–525. doi:10.2307/1895910. JSTOR 1895910.
- Owsley, Frank Lawrence (1929). "The Confederacy and King Cotton: A Study in Economic Coercion". The North Carolina Historical Review. 6 (4): 371–397. JSTOR 23514836.
- Owsley, Frank L.; Owsley, Harriet C. (1940). "The Economic Basis of Society in the Late Ante-Bellum South". The Journal of Southern History. 6 (1): 24–45. doi:10.2307/2191937. JSTOR 2191937.
- Owsley, Frank L. (1945). "The Pattern of Migration and Settlement on the Southern Frontier". The Journal of Southern History. 11 (2): 147–176. doi:10.2307/2198171. JSTOR 2198171.
