= Allen Tate: Orphan of the South =

2000 book by Thomas A. Underwood

- Author: Thomas A. Underwood
- Language: English
- Subject: Allen Tate
- Publisher: Princeton University Press
- Publication date: 2000
- Publication place: United States
- Pages: 440
- ISBN: 0-691-06950-6

Allen Tate: Orphan of the South is a biography of the American writer Allen Tate (1899–1979). It was written by Thomas A. Underwood and published by Princeton University Press in 2000. The book covers Tate's life and work until 1938 and focuses on his role as a poet and literary critic concerned with Southern history.
