= Edd Winfield Parks =

American educator and writer (1906–1968)

Edd Parks
- Born: February 26, 1905; Newbern, Tennessee
- Died: May 7, 1968 (aged 63)
- Occupations: Professor, writer
- Spouse: Aileen Wells (m. 1933)
- Writing career
- Period: 20th century
- Genres: Literary criticism, fiction

Edd Winfield Parks (February 25, 1906 – May 7, 1968) was an American educator and writer.

== Biography ==
Parks was born in Newbern, Tennessee, the son of Edward Winfield and Emma Parks. He was educated at Harvard University and attained his Ph.D. at Vanderbilt University in 1929. From 1923 to 1924, and again in 1931, he was a reporter for the Los Angeles Times. He married Aileen Wells on November 3, 1933. Aileen was a writer of juvenile fiction.

He began his teaching career at Vanderbilt University (1929–1933) and taught at Cumberland University (1933–1935)) and then moved to Athens, Georgia, where he became a professor of English at the University of Georgia in 1935. He stayed there for the remainder of his career. During World War II, he enlisted in the American army and joined Military Intelligence where he served from 1943 to 1946.

His contribution to literature focused on his study of letters from the American South. This began with The Southern Poets, published in 1936. He also published critical essays on Henry Timrod, Charles Egbert Craddock, and William Gilmore Sims. In addition to his literary efforts he also wrote several juvenile books in collaboration with his wife, Aileen. These include Long Hunter (1942), Pioneer Pilot (1947), and Safe On Second: The Story Of A Little Leaguer (1953).

Parks was president of a number of professional organizations, including the Southern Atlantic Modern Language Association (1958–1959) and the Southeastern American Studies Association (1961–1962). He was chairman of the Southern Humanities Conference (1962–1963). He was on the editorial boards of the Georgia Review, the American Quarterly, and the Mississippi Quarterly.

== Works ==
- The Southern Poets (anthology, 1936)
- Sut Lovingood Travels With Old Abe Lincoln (as editor, 1937, of a novel by George Washington Harris)
- Segments of Southern Thought, (1938)
- Charles Egbert Carddock, (1941)
- Essays of Henry Timrod, (1942)
- Long Hunter, (1942)
- Pioneer Pilot, (1947)
- Predestinate Iron, (1948)
- Little Long Rifle, (1949)
- A Modern American Sampler, (1950)
- Safe On Second: The Story Of A Little Leaguer, (1953)
- Teddy Roosevelt, All-Round Boy, (1953)
- Teddy Roosevelt, Young Rough Rider, (1953)
- Backwater, (1957)
- William Gilmore Sims As Literary Critic, (1961)
- Ante-Bellum Southern Literary Critics, (1963)
- Nashoba, (1963)
- Edgar Allan Poe As Literary Critic, (1964)
- The Collected Poems of Henry Timrod, (1964) (with Aileen Wells Parks)
- Thomas MacDonagh, (1967) (with Aileen Wells Parks)
- Sidney Lanier: The Man, The Poet, The Critic, (1968)
