= Caroline Gordon =

American novelist (1895–1981)

Caroline Gordon

Caroline Ferguson Gordon (October 6, 1895 – April 11, 1981) was an American novelist and literary critic who, while still in her thirties, received a Guggenheim Fellowship in 1932 and an O. Henry Award in 1934. Her early fiction was influenced by her association with the Southern Agrarians.

== Biography ==
Gordon was born and raised in Todd County, Kentucky at her family's plantation home, "Woodstock". She was educated at her father's Clarksville Classical School for Boys in Montgomery County, Tennessee. In 1916, Gordon graduated from Bethany College and became a writer of society news for the Chattanooga Reporter newspaper in Chattanooga, Tennessee.

In the summer of 1924, Gordon returned home to Kentucky, when she met the poet Allen Tate. She moved with Tate to New York City, where they first lived together in Greenwich Village. They later shared a house with Hart Crane in Patterson, New York. Tate and Gordon wed in New York City on May 15, 1925, and their daughter Nancy was born in September 1925. In 1928, the family traveled to Europe, where they spent the next two years.

After returning from Europe in 1930, Gordon and her family moved to BenFolly, a house they purchased in Clarksville, Tennessee, with the assistance of Tate's brother Ben. Gordon and Tate entertained literary notables such as Robert Lowell, who camped on their lawn one summer. Other visitors included F. Scott Fitzgerald, Ernest Hemingway, William Faulkner, Flannery O'Connor, T. S. Eliot, Robert Penn Warren, and Ford Madox Ford. Ford served as a mentor to Gordon, counseling her on her literary work and prodding her into completing her first novel Penhally, published in 1931. Gordon received the Guggenheim and the O. Henry during this early period. The O. Henry was a unique second-place prize awarded for her 1934 short story "Old Red", published in Scribner's Magazine. Gordon's early fiction was influenced by her association with the Southern Agrarians. Paul V. Murphy writes that she "exhibited a southern nostalgia as strong as any member of the group, including Davidson, the most unreconstructed of the Agrarians". Between 1934 and 1972, Gordon published nine additional novels, five written during the late 1930s and World War II.

Tate and Gordon moved to Monteagle, Tennessee, in 1942. At some point in the 1940s, they moved to Princeton, New Jersey, to a house they named BenBrackets. In 1945, Gordon and Tate divorced, but they remarried in 1946 and moved back to New York City.

Gordon became a friend and mentor to novelists Walker Percy and Flannery O'Connor. Gordon also became a close friend of author Brainard Cheney and his wife, Frances (Fanny) Neel Cheney. Brainard Cheney considered Gordon to be his "literary mentor." According to Cheney, she taught him to write literature as compared to his previous occupation as a crime reporter. On November 24, 1947, Gordon converted to Catholicism. Influenced by Gordon, the Cheneys also converted to Catholicism. Gordon introduced the couple to Flannery O'Connor, with whom they became close friends. She corresponded with literary critic M. Bernetta Quinn.

Gordon divorced Tate in 1959 on grounds of desertion. Tate remarried four days later, but he and Gordon remained correspondents and friends until Tate's death in 1979.

In her later years, Gordon moved to San Cristóbal de las Casas in Chiapas, Mexico. On March 1, 1981, she suffered a stroke. Gordon died six weeks later, following surgery, at age 85.

== Selected works ==
=== Novels ===
- Penhally (1931)
- Aleck Maury, Sportsman (1934)
- None Shall Look Back (1937)
- The Garden of Adonis (1937)
- Green Centuries (1941)
- The Women on the Porch (1944)
- The Strange Children (1951)
- The Malefactors (1956)
- The Glory of Hera (1972)

=== Short story collections ===
- The Forest of the South (1945)
- Old Red and Other Stories (1963)
- The Collected Stories of Caroline Gordon (1981)

=== Other works ===
- The House of Fiction: An Anthology of the Short Story (with Allen Tate) (1950)
- A Good Soldier: A Key to the Novels of Ford Madox Ford (1957)
- How to Read a Novel (1957)

=== Short stories ===
Title	Publication	Collected in
"Summer Dust"	Gyroscope (November 1929)	The Forest of the South
"The Long Day"	Gyroscope (February 1930)	The Forest of the South
"The Ice House"	Hound & Horn (July–September 1931)	The Forest of the South
"Mr. Powers"	Scribner's Magazine (November 1931)	The Forest of the South
"The Captive"	Hound & Horn (October–December 1932)	The Forest of the South
"Tom Rivers"	The Yale Review (October 1933)	The Forest of the South
"Old Red"	The Criterion (October 1933)	The Forest of the South
"To Thy Chamber Window, Sweet"	Scribner's Magazine (December 1934)	The Forest of the South
"The Last Day in the Field"	Scribner's Magazine (March 1935)	The Forest of the South
"One More Time"	Scribner's Magazine (December 1935)	The Forest of the South
"B From Bull's Foot" (with Nash Buckingham)	Scribner's Magazine (August 1936)	-
"The Brilliant Leaves"	Mademoiselle (November 1937)	The Forest of the South
"The Enemies" a.k.a. "The Enemy"	The Southern Review (Spring 1938)	The Forest of the South
"Her Quaint Honour" a.k.a. "Frankie and Thomas and Bud Asbury"	The Southern Review (Spring 1939)	The Forest of the South
"The Forest of the South"	Maryland Quarterly #1 (1944)	The Forest of the South
"All Lovers Love the Spring"	Mademoiselle (February 1944)	The Forest of the South
"Hear the Nightingale Sing"	Harper's Magazine (June 1945)	The Forest of the South
"The Burning Eyes"	The Forest of the South (1945)	The Forest of the South
"The Olive Garden"	The Sewanee Review (October–December 1945)	The Collected Stories of Caroline Gordon
"The Petrified Woman"	Mademoiselle (September 1947)	Old Red and Other Stories
"The Presence"	Harper's Bazaar (October 1948)	Old Red and Other Stories
"The Waterfall"	The Sewanee Review (October–December 1950)	The Collected Stories of Caroline Gordon
"Emmanuele! Emmanuele!"	The Sewanee Review (Spring 1954)	Old Red and Other Stories
"One Against Thebes" a.k.a. "The Dragon's Teeth"	Shenandoah (Autumn 1961)	Old Red and Other Stories
"A Walk with the Accuser"	The Southern Review (Summer 1977)	The Collected Stories of Caroline Gordon
