= Allen Tate =

American poet, essayist, social commentator (1899–1979)

- Born: November 19, 1899; Winchester, Kentucky, U.S.
- Died: February 9, 1979 (aged 79); Nashville, Tennessee, U.S.
- Education: Cincinnati Conservatory of Music; Vanderbilt University (BA)
- Occupations: Poet, essayist
- Spouses: Caroline Gordon (m. 1925; div. 1945) (m. 1946; div. 1959) Isabella Gardner (m. 1959; div. 1966) Helen Heinz (m. 1966)
- Writing career
- Genres: Poetry, literary criticism
- Notable work: "Ode to the Confederate Dead"
- Literary movement: New Criticism

John Orley Allen Tate (November 19, 1899 – February 9, 1979), known professionally as Allen Tate, was an American poet, essayist, social commentator, and poet laureate from 1943 to 1944. Among his best known works are the poems "Ode to the Confederate Dead" (1928) and "The Mediterranean" (1933), and his only novel The Fathers (1938). He is associated with New Criticism, the Fugitives and the Southern Agrarians.

== Life ==
=== Early years ===
Tate was born near Winchester, Kentucky, to John Orley Tate, a Kentucky businessman and Eleanor Parke Custis Varnell from Virginia. On the Bogan side of her grandmother's family, Eleanor Varnell was a distant relative of George Washington; she left Tate a copper luster pitcher that Washington had ordered from London for his sister.

In 1916 and 1917 Tate studied the violin at the Cincinnati Conservatory of Music.

=== College and the Fugitives ===
Tate entered Vanderbilt University in 1918. He was the first undergraduate to be invited to join a group of men who met regularly to read and discuss their poetry: they included John Crowe Ransom and Donald Davidson on the faculty; James M. Frank, a prominent Nashville businessman who hosted the meetings; and Sidney Mttron Hirsch, a mystic and playwright, who presided. Tate graduated Vanderbilt in 1922 with a B.A. magna cum laude and Phi Beta Kappa.

In 1922, the group began publishing a poetry magazine named The Fugitive, so the group was known as the Fugitives. Tate took along a younger friend to some meetings, sophomore Robert Penn Warren, who was invited to become a member in 1923. The aim of the group, according to the critic J. A. Bryant, was "to demonstrate that a group of southerners could produce important work in the medium [of poetry], devoid of sentimentality and carefully crafted," and they wrote in the formalist tradition that valued the skillful use of meter and rhyme.

When Robert Penn Warren left Southwestern College to accept a position at Louisiana State University, he recommended Tate to replace him. Tate accepted the position, and spent 1934 through 1936 there as lecturer in English.

=== 1920s ===
Tate made his debut as a critic in the weekly book page Davidson edited for the Nashville Tennessean, publishing 29 reviews there during 1924. The fifth book he reviewed was An Anthology of Verse by American Negroes, edited by Newman Ivey White and Walter Clinton Jackson--"the first significant attempt" by "white critics to do justice to Negro literature in America." He faulted the editors' standards of "refinement" and "taste." "This of Claude McKay: 'Some of his poems are too erotic for good taste and conventional morality.' Whose good taste and whose morality?" It was easy "to understand why they overlooked altogether the work of Jean Toomer. Toomer is the finest Negro literary artist that has yet appeared in the American scene, but he is interested in the interior of Negro life, not in the pressure of American culture on the Negro."

In 1924, Tate moved to New York City where he met poet Hart Crane, with whom he had been corresponding for some time. Over a four-year period, Tate worked freelance for The Nation, and contributed to the Hound & Horn, Poetry magazine, and others. To make ends meet, he worked as a janitor.

During a summer visit with the poet Robert Penn Warren in Kentucky, he began a relationship with writer Caroline Gordon. The two lived together in Greenwich Village, but moved with Crane to a house in Patterson, New York, near "Robber Rocks," the home of friends Slater Brown and Sue Brown. Tate married Gordon in New York in May 1925. Their daughter Nancy was born in September. In 1928, along with other New York City friends, Tate went to Europe. In London, he visited with T. S. Eliot, whose poetry and criticism he greatly admired, and he also visited Paris.

In 1928, Tate published his first book of poetry, Mr. Pope and Other Poems, which contained his most famous poem, "Ode to the Confederate Dead" (not to be confused with "Ode to the Confederate Dead at Magnolia Cemetery" by the poet Henry Timrod). That same year, Tate also published the biography Stonewall Jackson: The Good Soldier. Later he became tired of the "Ode."

Just before leaving for Europe in 1928, Tate described himself to John Gould Fletcher as "an enforced atheist". He later told Fletcher, "I am an atheist, but a religious one — which means that there is no organization for my religion." He regarded secular attempts to develop a system of thought for the modern world as misguided. "Only God," he insisted, "can give the affair a genuine purpose." In his essay "The Fallacy of Humanism" (1929), Tate criticized the humanists of his time for creating a value system without investing it with any identifiable source of authority. "Religion is the only technique for the validation of values," he wrote. Although he was attracted to Roman Catholicism, he deferred converting. Louis D. Rubin, Jr. observes that Tate may have waited "because he realized that for him at this time it would be only a strategy, an intellectual act".

In 1929, Tate published a second biography, Jefferson Davis: His Rise and Fall.

=== 1930s ===
After two years abroad, the Tates returned to the United States in 1930. During two months in New York, Tate secured a publisher for a symposium on the South and agrarianism that he and Ransom, Davidson, Andrew Lytle, and others had been planning. In Tennessee, the Tates took up residence at Benfolly in Clarksville, Tennessee| an antebellum mansion with a 185-acre estate attached. Allen's brother Ben Tate, "who had made a lot of northern money out of coal.", purchased the house for them. House guests at Benfolly were frequent: Ford Madox Ford, Edmund Wilson, Louise Bogan, Phelps Putnam, Stark Young, the Howard Bakers, the Malcolm Cowleys, the Ransoms, the Warrens.

Meeting at Benfolly and in Nashville, Tate, Ransom, Davidson et al. completed work on their symposium, I'll Take My Stand by Twelve Southerners, published in 1930. Tate didn't like the title; he had argued for "Tracts Against Communism." His contribution was "Remarks on the southern Religion": the Old South was a feudal society "without a feudal religion"; her Protestant "religious mind was inarticulate, dissenting, and schismatical."

In 1933 Lincoln Kirstein, co-founder and editor of Hound & Horn, wrote Tate, the Southern editor, that he "would like very much to know what all you people think could be done in relation to black and white." . . . Was the friction "inevitably racial, or accidentally economic?" Why were sexual relations between a white man and a black woman tolerated but not the reverse? Tate stated that there was "absolutely no 'solution' to the race problem in the South. That is, there is no solution that will remove the tension and the oppression that the negro must feel. . . . When two such radically different races live together, one must rule. I think the negro race is an inferior race." The key was social order, which served not social justice but "legal justice for the ruled race. . . . Liberal agitators" deprived "the negro of even the legal justice." Liberal policy was like "that of the Reconstruction, . . . a steady campaign against the Southern social system . . . to crush absolutely the remaining power of independent agriculture." As for the sexual question, "it is upon the sexual consent of women that the race depends for the future. . . . Under the industrial capitalist regime . . . women are no longer the very center of the social system. . . . What is to be done about all this I do not know; and I am inclined to think no one else knows."

During this time, Tate also became the de facto associate editor of The American Review, which was published and edited by Seward Collins. Tate believed The American Review could popularize the work of the Southern Agrarians. He objected to Collins's open support of Benito Mussolini and Adolf Hitler, and condemned Fascism in an article in The New Republic in 1936. Much of Tate's major volumes of poetry were published in the 1930s, and the scholar David Havird describes this publication history in poetry as follows:

By 1937, when he published his first Selected Poems, Tate had written all of the shorter poems upon which his literary reputation came to rest. This collection--which brought together work from two recent volumes, Poems: 1928-1931 (1932) and the privately printed The Mediterranean and Other Poems (1936), as well as the early Mr. Pope--included "Mother and Son," "Last Days of Alice," "The Wolves," "The Mediterranean," "Aeneas at Washington," "Sonnets at Christmas," and the final version of "Ode to the Confederate Dead." While visiting in Washington in 1936, Tate was interviewed by the Washington "'Post'": "South Is U.S. Literary Center, Asserts Allen Tate, Noted Poet."

Ford dedicated his book Provence to Gordon and Tate writing 'who came to Provence and there wrote to "That Sweet Land" the poem called "The Mediterranean" and where we went in the boat was a long bay".

Tate and Herbert Agar in 1936 put together a symposium entitled Who Owns America? A New Declaration of Independence (Houghton Mifflin); the 21 contributors included eight Agrarians, three economists, a woman psychologist, and an English Distributist. The book made the bestseller list; it was reissued in 1999 by ISI Books. In 1936 also Scribner's published Tate's Reactionary Essays on Poetry and Idea; Maxwell Perkins, editor to both Tate and Gordon, told Tate, "It is an honor to publish this book."

In 1938 Tate published his only novel, The Fathers, which drew upon knowledge of his mother's ancestral home and family in Fairfax County, Virginia.

=== 1940s ===
Tate was the poet-in-residence at Princeton University from 1939 to 1942, and founded the university's Creative Writing Program. He established the Mesures Lectures. During 1940 through 41 he was also a regular panelist, with Mark Van Doren and Huntington Cairns, on the popular CBS radio program Invitation to Learning and sometimes a guest the following year. Random House published the transcripts.

The Tates moved to Monteagle, Tennessee in 1942 to write, living on publishers' advances (Gordon was a novelist). Robert Lowell and Jean Stafford joined them. Lytle was teaching history at the nearby University of the South and was made editor of the Sewanee Review for a year; Tate helped him by getting poems and articles from Wallace Stevens, William Meredith (poet), and others.

In 1943 Tate was appointed the first rotating Chair of Poetry at the Library of Congress, where he established the Associate Fellows in American Letters. He initiated recordings of 16th and 17th century English lyrics and modern American poetry from Emily Dickinson to Karl Shapiro for Books for the Blind. He reviewed Shapiro's first book of poems, Person, Place and Thing, for the magazine Common Sense in 1943, writing the review as a letter to Sgt. Shapiro, then stationed in Australia, mixing some compositional advice with high praise ("May I list here certain poems that for me are already placed among the best poetry of our time?"), and beginning a long friendship. Tate was known for his aid to talented younger writers: John Berryman, Joseph Frank (writer), Robert Lowell, William Meredith Jr, Howard Nemerov, Delmore Schwartz, and Peter Taylor.

Tate edited the Sewanee Review from 1944 to 1946. Publishing Marianne Moore, Wallace Stevens, Jacques Maritain, T. S. Eliot, John Peale Bishop, Malcom Cowley, Mark Van Doren, Randall Jarrell, R. P. Blackmur, John Berryman, Dylan Thomas, Peter Taylor, and others, he greatly increased the magazine's circulation and made it one of the foremost quarterlies in the English language.

Tate and Gordon were divorced in 1945 and remarried in 1946. Though devoted to one another for life, they could not get along and would divorce again in 1959.

Divorced and remarried, the Tates lived in New York from 1946 to 1951. Tate published Poems 1922–1947. It included the long "Seasons of the Soul," written during World War II, which he valued more highly than the "Ode." He was editor of belle lettres at Henry Holt and Co. for two years and a lecturer at New York University for four years. Tate received an honorary Litt.D. from the University of Louisville in 1948 and was a visiting professor at the University of Chicago in 1949. He was elected to the National Institute of Arts and Letters in 1949. Tate would try without success until the end of his life to get Gordon elected to the institute.

=== 1950s ===
In 1950, Tate converted to Roman Catholicism. His godfather was the philosopher Jacques Maritain, who had been his friend at Princeton for several years. Gordon had joined the Church in 1947. Following the Tates into the Church later were their daughter and son-in-law, Nancy and Percy Wood; their Tennessee friends Brainard Cheney and his wife Frances; and their friend George Frederick Morgan, Tate's former Princeton student and editor of the Hudson Review. He had a significant correspondence with Catholic nun, literary critic and poet M. Bernetta Quinn.

In 1951, six weeks after his baptism, Tate, writing "as a Catholic," published a letter in The New York Times objecting to Cardinal Francis Spellman's banning the Italian film The Miracle. Maritain told him, "Only you would have had the nerve to fight Spellman." The Supreme Court in 1952 struck down New York State's ban of The Miracle, Justice Felix Frankfurter citing Tate's letter to the New York Times.

When Warren resigned from the University of Minnesota to go to Yale in 1951, the university offered the position to Tate. Tate was one of six U.S. delegates in 1952, including William Faulkner, Katherine Anne Porter, and W. H. Auden, to the Congress for Cultural Freedom in Paris. Later in 1952, the U.S. State Department sent Tate to the UNESCO Conference on the Arts in Venice; in Rome he had an audience with Pope Pius XII. He was a Fulbright Lecturer in Rome, 1953–54, and was the first Writer in Residence at the American Academy there. Tate was awarded honorary Litt. D. degrees by Coe College (1955) and Colgate University (1956).

Tate was awarded the Bollingen Prize for Poetry for 1956. During the summers he taught at Harvard University and Brandeis University. In 1958 he was awarded the Christian Culture Gold Medal in Canada "as an outstanding lay exponent of Christian ideals." He was a Fulbright Lecturer at the University of Oxford and the University of Leeds, 1958–59.

In 1959, Gordon was granted a divorce from Tate in Minneapolis on grounds of desertion. Tate four days later married the poet Isabella Gardner (1915–1981) in Wellfleet, Massachusetts. His friend Francis Biddle, the attorney general under President Franklin Roosevelt, was best man. In Minneapolis Tate had been living in the Oak Grove Hotel; Gardner bought and furnished a house. Her two children from two previous husbands lived with them from time to time.

"Homage to Allen Tate," honoring his 60th birthday, was published in the Autumn 1959 Sewanee Review, including contributions by Ransom, Lytle, Cowley, Eliot, Blackmur, Porter, Van Doren, Davidson, and Lowell.

=== 1960s ===
"'Allen Tate Reads from His Own Works'" helped launch the Yale Series of Recorded Poets in 1960. That year Tate edited Selected Poems of John Peale Bishop (Chatto & Windus), and The Fathers was reprinted (Eyre & Spottiswood and Swallow). The Times Literary Supplement said it was "possibly one of the great novels of our time'" and Encounter and the New Statesman published long review-articles by Frank Kermode and Janet Adam Smith. Tate said, "The British read the book as I conceived it--not as 'another Southern novel.'" He received an honorary Litt.D. from the University of Kentucky in 1960.

Tate published Poems in 1960, adding two poems in terza rima, "The Swimmers" and "The Buried Lake." T. S. Eliot said Tate's were the best terza rima poems in English.

The Tates were invited to the inauguration of John F. Kennedy in 1961. First Lady Jaqueline Kennedy told Tate, "Oh, I took your picture!" (she had once been a newspaper photographer). Tate was awarded the Brandeis Creative Arts Medal in Poetry in 1961 for lifetime achievement.

When the issue of racial integration came to a new crisis in riots in 1962 at the University of Mississippi, Tate, Davidson, Warren, and Charlie Foster, Tate's colleague and close friend from New England, exchanged views. Tate was "in favor of Negro rights" but thought "the Supreme Court has gone about it from the wrong end. The vote is the thing; school integration, even for those who want it, will never be solidly based without the Negro vote." He was annoyed "that the Southern Way of Life becomes a popular cause only when race relations are upset."

Italians awarded Tate the Dante Alighieri Society's gold medal for 1962. Carleton College awarded him an honorary Litt.D. in 1963.

The Tates spent their summer vacations in England and Italy, seeing among others the Eliots, Louis MacNeice, Yvor Richards, W. H. Auden, Graham Greene, the Joseph Franks, Edith Sitwell, the Herbert Reeds, the Roy Fullers, the C. Day Lewises, and the Stephen Spenders, who gave them a cocktail party in 1962. Isabella met Natasha Spender, with whom Tate had had an affair. Tate remained friends with the Spenders until his death as well as with Elizabeth Hardwick, his other serious affair during his marriage with Gordon.

Tate brought "a procession of distinguished visitors to Minneapolis," Charlie Foster said, and the cocktail parties the Tates had for them allowed faculty and sometimes graduate students to meet them: it was "a kind of salon."

Isabella gave a large dinner party for Tate's 65th birthday, inviting 26 guests. Tate was elected to the American Academy of Arts and Letters, which had only 50 members, in 1964. He was the subject of a long illustrated article leading off the arts section of the Sunday Minneapolis Star Tribune for Jan. 24, 1965. It said Tate "is one Southern conservative who is not enamored with Barry Goldwater. 'Goldwater is a fine example of the complete decay of conservatism,' Tate said, his oversize head shaking sadly. 'I'd prefer the welfare state to his caricature.'"

Tate moved back into the Oak Grove Hotel after Gardner learned that he had been having an affair with a graduate student, Helen Heinz, a nun who was assistant director of nursing at a county hospital. He edited a special Eliot issue of the Sewanee Review, which was reissued as a book in 1966, T.S. Eliot, the Man and His Work. He was named the first Regents Professor of English at Minnesota. Gardner divorced Tate in March 1966; he and Helen were married in July in Tennessee.

Tate was a visiting professor at the University of North Carolina at Greensboro, fall 1966, and at Vanderbilt University, spring 1967. For Francis Biddle's 80th birthday dinner in Washington, Tate delivered a greeting speech in Latin. He sold his papers to the Firestone Library at Princeton; the proceeds would help build a new house for his retirement at Sewanee. Twin sons, John and Michael, were born prematurely to the Tates in Nashville in August 1967.

Tate was elected president of the National Institute of Arts and Letters. He delivered the principal address at Ransom's 80th birthday celebration at Kenyon College. Upon his retirement from Minnesota in June 1968 the family moved to Sewanee.

While the Tates were at Lytle's for dinner one evening in July 1968, the babysitter allowed Michael to choke to death in his crib on a toy telephone while she was running him a bath. Walter Sullivan, in his memoir of Tate, claims that the Tates broke off contact with Andrew Lytle afterwards. Robert Lowell commemorated the infant boy's death in his poem "Michael Tate: August 1967–July 1968".

Tate resigned as president of the National Institute in November 1968 because of the tiring trips to New York. He edited The Complete Poems and Selected Criticism of Edgar Allan Poe (New American Library) and published Essays of Four Decades (Swallow and Oxford). He received an honorary D.Litt. from University of North Carolina at Greensboro in 1969. In December another son was born, Benjamin Lewis Bogan Tate.

=== 1970s ===
Tate gave the annual Joseph Warren Beach Memorial Lecture at the University of Minnesota in 1970 and read at the Poetry International Festival in London. He and Helen spent two weeks in Italy; in Florence he attended the dinner celebrating Alfredo Rizzardi's translation of Ode to the Confederate Dead and Other Poems. He received an honorary D.Litt. from the University of the South.

Tate published The Swimmers and Other Selected Poems (Oxford and Scribners) in 1971. He lectured at UNC Greensboro for two weeks in 1970 and 1971 and at Harvard for four days in 1971. He was earning as much as he could by lecturing because the annuity his brother Ben left him would expire after his death. He had to cancel his Hopwood Awards Lecture at the University of Michigan in 1972 when he was hospitalized at the Vanderbilt Hospital for ten days with bronchitis and emphysema; Gordon substituted for him.

David McDowell at Crown Publishers recommended Tate to the Nobel Prize Committee in literature.

Tate received a medal for distinction in literature from the University of South Carolina. He was sick when he delivered the three Gauss Lectures for 1973 at Princeton; he collapsed afterwards and was in the hospital at Princeton for ten days with emphysema. In 1974 Tate gave a lecture at the Library of Congress on the centenary of Robert Frost's birth.

Tate's 75th birthday was celebrated two days at Sewanee and one evening in London. At Sewanee the program included Denis Donoghue, Cleanth Brooks, Howard Nemerov, William Jay Smith, Radcliffe Squires, Walter Sullivan, Louis Rubin, and Lewis Simpson. Tate wasn't allowed to attend the public events but, though weak, was engaging and witty at the social events which included his friends Eudora Welty, Joseph Frank, Francis Fergusson, and others. In London at the Mermaid Theatre Stephen Spender presided at a panel including I. A. Richards, Roy Fuller, and Robert Lowell, followed by a party in the Green Room.

Tate was hospitalized at Vanderbilt Hospital for three weeks in 1975 following a coma; he was now bedridden. His Memoirs and Opinions, 1926-1974, was published by Swallow. He received the Ingram Merrill Foundation's Award in Literature for 1975. In 1976 he was awarded the National Medal for Literature; William Jay Smith accepted it for him.

The Tates moved to Nashville to be near Allen's lung specialist. They took a vow of celibacy and were received back into the Church. Tate had numerous visitors to his small room; on the walls were pictures of Ransom and Eliot, "my two masters." He was connected to an oxygen tank. Collected Poems, 1916-1976 was published in 1977 by Farrar, Straus, & Giroux. It was awarded the Lenore Marshall Poetry Prize for the best book of poems in 1977.

Tate died in the Vanderbilt Hospital February 9, 1979. He was buried at Sewanee.

== Attitudes on race ==
Literary scholars have questioned the relationship between the cultural attitudes of Modernist poets on issues such as race and the writing produced by the poets. The 1930s saw Tate's most notable stances on matters that may or may not be connected to literary craft. For example, though Tate spoke well of the work of fellow Modernist poet Langston Hughes, in 1931, Tate pressured his colleague Thomas Dabney Mabry, Jr., into canceling a reception for Hughes, comparing the idea of socializing with the black poet to meeting socially with his black cook. John L. Grigsby describes Tate as a rare "nonracist equalitarian" among the Southern Agrarians.

In the 1930s Tate held prejudices against blacks. He expressed views against interracial marriage and miscegenation and refused to associate with black writers (like Langston Hughes). Tate also believed in white supremacy. Underwood (p. 291) doesn't, however, quote Lincoln Kirstein's reply to Tate's letter (see the 1930)s: "The most lucid and carefully thought out attitude that I have ever seen in regard to the whole business."

According to the critic Ian Hamilton, Tate and his co-agrarians had been more than ready at the time to overlook the anti-Semitism of the American Review in order to promote their 'spiritual' defense of the Deep South's traditions. In a 1934 review, "A View of the Whole South", Tate reviews W. T. Couch's "Culture in The South: A Symposium by Thirty-one Authors" and defends racial hegemony: "I argue it this way: the white race seems determined to rule the Negro race in its midst; I belong to the white race; therefore I intend to support white rule. Lynching is a symptom of weak, inefficient rule; but you can't destroy lynching by fiat or social agitation; lynching will disappear when the white race is satisfied that its supremacy will not be questioned in social crises."

According to David Yezzi, who teaches at Johns Hopkins University, Tate held the conventional social views of a white Southerner in 1934: an "inherited racism, a Southern legacy rooted in place and time that Tate later renounced." Tate was born of a Scotch-Irish lumber manager whose business failures required moving several times per year, Tate said of his upbringing ""we might as well have been living, and I been born, in a tavern at a crossroads." However, his views on race were not passively incorporated; Thomas Underwood documents Tate's pursuit of racist ideology: "Tate also drew ideas from nineteenth-century proslavery theorists such as Thomas Roderick Dew, a professor at The College of William and Mary, and William Harper, of the University of South Carolina — "We must revive these men, he said." In the 1930s Tate was infuriated when another writer implied that he was a fascist.

== Awards ==
- Bollingen Prize for Poetry, 1956.
- Christian Culture Gold Medal, Canada, "as an outstanding lay exponent of Christian ideals," 1958.
- Brandeis Medal in Poetry for Lifetime Achievement, 1961.
- Dante Medal, Italy, 1962.
- Ingram Merrill Foundation Award in Literature, 1975.
- National Medal for Literature, "for the excellence of his total contribution to literature," 1976.
- Lenore Marshall Poetry Prize for Poems, 1919-1976, 1978.

== Bibliography ==
=== Poetry ===
- Poems, 1928-1931, 1932.
- The Mediterranean and Other Poems, 1936.
- Selected Poems, 1937.
- The Winter Sea, 1944.
- Poems, 1920-1945, 1947.
- Poems, 1922-1947, 1948.
- Two Conceits for the Eye to Sing, If Possible, 1950.
- Poems, 1960.
- Poems, 1961.
- Collected Poems, 1970.
- The Swimmers and Other Selected Poems, 1970.
- Collected Poems 1919-1976, 1976.

=== Prose ===
- Stonewall Jackson: The Good Soldier (biography), 1928.
- Jefferson Davis: His Rise and Fall (biography), 1929.
- Reactionary Essays on Poetry and Ideas, 1936.
- The Fathers (novel), 1938.
- Reason in Madness (essays), 1941.
- On the Limits of Poetry: Selected Essays, 1928–1948, 1948.
- The Hovering Fly (essays), 1949.
- The Forlorn Demon (essays), 1953.
- The Man of Letters in the Modern World (essays), 1955.
- Collected Essays, 1959.
- Essays of Four Decades, 1969.
- Memoirs and Opinions, 1926-1974, 1975.
- The Poetry Reviews of Allen Tate, 1924–1944, ed. by Ashley Brown and Frances Neel Cheney, 1983.

=== Correspondence ===
- The Literary Correspondence of Donald Davidson & Allen Tate, (Georgia, 1974)
- The Republic of Letters in America: The Correspondence of John Peale Bishop & Allen Tate (Kentucky, 1981)
- The Lytle-Tate Letters: The Correspondence of Andrew Lytle & Allen Tate (Mississippi, 1987).
- Exiles and Fugitives: The Letters of Jacques and Raissa Maritain, Allen Tate, and Caroline Gordon (LSU, 1992).
- Cleanth Brooks & Allen Tate: Collected Letters, 1933-1976 (Missouri, 1998).

=== Secondary sources ===
- Donald Davidson, Southern Writers in the Modern World (Georgia, 1958).
- Louise Cowan, The Fugitive Group: A Literary History (LSU, 1958).
- Rob Roy Purdy, ed., Fugitives' Reunion: Conversations at Vanderbilt, May 3–5, 1956 (Vanderbilt, 1959).
- R. K. Meiners, The last Alternatives: A Study of the Works of Allen Tate (Alan Swallow, 1963).
- M. E. Bradford, Rumors of Mortality: An Introduction to Allen Tate (Argus Academic Press, 1969).
- Radcliffe Squires, Allen Tate: A Literary Biography (Pegasus, 1971).
- Radcliffe Squires, ed., Allen Tate and His Work (Minnesota,1972).
- Robert Buffington, "The Directing Mind: Allen Tate and the Profession of Letters," Southern Literary Journal, Spring 1973.
- Robert Buffington, "Disorder and Early Sorrow," Hudson Review, Summer 1978.
- Robert Buffington, "Allen Tate: Society, Vocation, Communion," Southern Review, January 1982.
- Robert S. Dupree, Allen Tate and the Augustinian Imagination: A Study of the Poetry(LSU, 1983).
- Walter Sullivan, Allen Tate: A Recollection (LSU, 1988).
- William Doreski, The Years of Our Friendship: Robert Lowell and Allen Tate (Mississippi,1990).
- Thomas A. Underwood, Allen Tate: Orphan of the South (Princeton, 2000).
- Robert Buffington, "A Conservative Revolution?," Sewanee Review, Summer 2003.
- Walter Sullivan, "Another Southern Connection: Allen Tate and Peter Taylor," Sewanee Review, Summer 2002.
- Robert Buffington, "Campaigning for Poetry," Sewanee Review, Summer 2005.
- Robert Buffington, "The Tates, Ford, and the House of Fiction," Sewanee Review, Winter 2008.
- Joseph Kuhn, Allen Tate: A Study in Southern Modernism and the Religious Imagination (Adam Mickiewicz University Press, 2009).
- Robert Buffington, "A Great Seizure of Poems," Sewanee Review, Winter 2012.
- Robert Buffington, "His Instrument, His Church, His Friends and Lovers: Tate, 1957–1958," Sewanee Review, Winter 2015.
- Robert Buffington, "Allen Tate and the Sewanee Review," Sewanee Review, Spring 2015.
- John V. Glass III, Allen Tate: The Modern Mind and the Discovery of Enduring Love (Catholic University of America, 2016).
- Robert Buffington, "Poets, Death, and the Sixties Disorder," Sewanee Review, Summer 2016.
