= Southern Agrarians =

Twelve authors of the Southern Agrarians manifesto

The Southern Agrarians were twelve American Southerners who wrote an agrarian literary manifesto in 1930. They and their essay collection, I’ll Take My Stand: The South and the Agrarian Tradition, contributed to the Southern Renaissance, the reinvigoration of Southern literature in the 1920s and 1930s. They were based at Vanderbilt University in Nashville. John Crowe Ransom was their unofficial leader, though Robert Penn Warren became their most prominent member. The membership overlaps with The Fugitives.

== Members ==
The twelve authors of the Southern Agrarians manifesto, I'll Take My Stand, were:

- Donald Davidson, poet, essayist, reviewer and historian
- John Gould Fletcher, poet and historian
- Henry Blue Kline
- Lyle H. Lanier
- Andrew Nelson Lytle, poet, novelist and essayist
- Herman Clarence Nixon
- Frank Lawrence Owsley, historian
- John Crowe Ransom, poet, professor, essayist
- Allen Tate, poet
- John Donald Wade, biographer and essayist
- Robert Penn Warren, poet, novelist, essayist and critic, later first poet laureate of the United States
- Stark Young, novelist, drama and literary critic, playwright

Other writers associated with the Agrarians include Richard M. Weaver, Caroline Gordon, Brainard Cheney and Herbert Agar.

== Background and general ideas ==
The Agrarians evolved from a philosophical discussion group known as the "Fugitives" or "Fugitive Poets". Many of the Southern Agrarians and Fugitive poets were connected to Vanderbilt University, either as students or as faculty members. Davidson, Lytle, Ransom, Tate, and Warren all attended the university; Davidson and Ransom later joined the faculty, along with Wade and Owsley. They were known also as "Twelve Southerners", the "Vanderbilt Agrarians", the "Nashville Agrarians", the "Tennessee Agrarians", and the "Fugitive Agrarians".

They were offended by H. L. Mencken's attacks on aspects of Southern culture that they valued, such as its agrarianism, conservatism, and religiosity. They sought to confront the widespread and rapidly increasing effects of modernity, urbanism, and industrialism on American (but especially Southern) culture and tradition. The Agrarians were influenced by the medievalism of Victorian writers Thomas Carlyle, John Ruskin and William Morris, as well as the French right-wing tradition that began with Counter-Enlightenment philosopher Joseph de Maistre, which they accessed through the writings of contemporaries T. E. Hulme, T. S. Eliot and Charles Maurras. The informal leader of the Fugitives and the Agrarians was John Crowe Ransom, but in a 1945 essay, he announced that he no longer believed in either the possibility or the desirability of an Agrarian restoration, which he declared a "fantasy".

=== I'll Take My Stand ===
I'll Take My Stand was criticized at the time, and since, as a reactionary and romanticized defense of the Old South and the Lost Cause of the Confederacy. It ignored slavery and denounced "progress", for example, and some critics considered it to be moved by nostalgia. A key quote from the "Introduction: A Statement of Principles" to their 1930 book I'll Take My Stand: The South and the Agrarian Tradition:

All the articles bear in the same sense upon the book's title-subject: all tend to support a Southern way of life against what may be called the American or prevailing way; and all as much as agree that the best terms in which to represent the distinction are contained in the phrase, Agrarian versus Industrial. ...Opposed to the industrial society is the agrarian, which does not stand in particular need of definition. An agrarian society is hardly one that has no use at all for industries, for professional vocations, for scholars and artists, and for the life of cities. Technically, perhaps, an agrarian society is one in which agriculture is the leading vocation, whether for wealth, for pleasure, or for prestige – a form of labor that is pursued with intelligence and leisure, and that becomes the model to which the other forms approach as well as they may. But an agrarian regime will be secured readily enough where the superfluous industries are not allowed to rise against it. The theory of agrarianism is that the culture of the soil is the best and most sensitive of vocations, and that therefore it should have the economic preference and enlist the maximum number of workers.

Though the book was reviewed widely, it only sold about 2000 copies as of 1940. It has been reprinted several times. The current edition was published by Louisiana State University Press in 2006 to mark the book's 75th anniversary.

=== Other publications ===
Most of the Southern Agrarians contributed to a second collection of essays, Who Owns America? (1936), which also included writings from English distributists.

The Agrarians were the most prolific contributors to The American Review, edited by Seward Collins. Various Agrarians contributed as many as 70 articles, led by Donald Davidson with 21. Scholar Louis Menand has identified many of their contributions as influential in spreading the idea of New Criticism to the United States from Britain.

Collins eventually became a public supporter of fascism. Several of the Agrarians came to regret (and renounce) their relationship with Collins, however, after his political views became better known. Agrarian Allen Tate wrote a rebuttal of fascism for the liberal The New Republic in 1936. Nevertheless, Tate remained in contact with Collins and continued to publish in The American Review until its demise, in 1937.

== Chapel Hill Sociologists ==
In the 1930s, the Agrarians were challenged by the modernizing social scientists (the "Chapel Hill Sociologists") based at the University of North Carolina (in Chapel Hill) and led by Howard W. Odum, on issues of urbanism, social progress, and the very nature and definition of the South. The sociologists produced Rupert Vance's The Human Geography of the South (1932), and Odum's Southern Regions of the United States (1936), as well as numerous articles in the journal Social Forces. The sociologists argued that the problems in the South stemmed from traditionalism which ought to and could be cured by modernization, the opposite of the Agrarian viewpoint.

== Robert Penn Warren ==
Robert Penn Warren emerged as the most accomplished of the Agrarians. He became a major American poet and novelist, winning the Pulitzer Prize for his 1946 All the King's Men.

At a reunion of the Fugitive Poets in 1956, Warren confessed that for about a decade — from just before World War II to some years after — he had shut Agrarianism from his mind as irrelevant to the cataclysmic social and political events then playing out in the world. Now, however, he believed that, rather than being irrelevant, his old Agrarian enthusiasms were tied into the major problems of the age. In the modern world, the individual had been marginalized, stripped of any sense of responsibility, or of past or place. "In this context," writes Paul V. Murphy, "the Agrarian image of a better antebellum South came to represent for Warren a potential source of spiritual revitalization. The past recalled, not as a mythical 'golden age' but 'imaginatively conceived and historically conceived in the strictest readings of the researchers', could be a 'rebuke to the present'."

It was Warren's concern with democracy, regionalism, personal liberty and individual responsibility that led him to support the civil rights movement, which he depicted in his nonfiction works Segregation (1956) and Who Speaks for the Negro? (1965) as a struggle for identity and individualism. As Hugh Ruppersburg, among others, has argued, Warren's support for the civil rights movement paradoxically stemmed from Agrarianism, which by the 1950s, meant for him something very different from the Agrarianism of I'll Take My Stand. As Warren's political and social views evolved, his notion of Agrarianism evolved with them. He came to support more progressive ideas and racial integration and was a close friend of the eminent African-American author Ralph Ellison. While Donald Davidson took a leading role in the attempt to preserve the system of segregation, Warren took his stand against it. As Paul V. Murphy writes, "Loyalty to the southern past and the ambiguous lessons of Agrarianism led both men in very different directions."

== Legacy ==
Louis D. Rubin Jr. assessed the Agrarians in 1979:

In retrospect the importance of I'll Take My Stand lay in its vigorous reaffirmation of religious humanism and its farseeing critique of the abuses of unchecked industrial exploitation. In certain crucial respects it is far closer in spirit and intent to works such as Henry David Thoreau's Walden, Edward Bellamy's Looking Backward, and T. S. Eliot's "The Waste Land" in its rebuke to an acquisitive business society. This, and not its topical prescriptions for the southern economy of the day, largely accounts for its continuing importance.

In 1981, University of Georgia Press published Why the South Will Survive: Fifteen Southerners Look at Their Region a Half Century after I'll Take My Stand, with contributions from Donald L. Anderson (1932–2004), M. E. Bradford, Cleanth Brooks, Thomas Fleming, Samuel T. Francis, George Garrett, William C. Havard, Hamilton C. Horton Jr., Thomas H. Landess, Marion Montgomery, John Shelton Reed, George C. Rogers Jr., David B. Sentelle, and Clyde N. Wilson, with an afterword by Lytle.

In recent decades, some American traditional conservatives such as Allan C. Carlson, Joseph Scotchie, and Eugene Genovese have praised the Agrarian themes in light of what they see as the failures of highly urbanized and industrialized modern societies.

Today, the Southern Agrarians are regularly lauded in neo-Confederate media such as the Southern Partisan. Some of their social, economic, and political ideas have been refined and updated by writers such as Allan C. Carlson and Wendell Berry. The Intercollegiate Studies Institute has published books which further explore the ideas of the Agrarians.

== See also ==
- Agrarianism
- Tennessee literature

== Bibliography ==
- Davidson, Donald; Fletcher, John Gould; Kline, Henry Blue; Lanier, Lyle H; Lytle, Andrew Nelson; Nixon, Herman Clarence; Owsley, Frank Lawrence; Ransom, John Crowe; Tate, Allen; Wade, John Donald; Warren, Robert Penn; Young, Stark (2006), I'll Take My Stand: The South and the Agrarian Tradition (75th anniversary ed.), Louisiana State Univ. Press, ISBN 0-8071-3208-X.
- ———; Fletcher, John Gould; Kline, Henry Blue; Lanier, Lyle H; Lytle, Andrew Nelson; Nixon, Herman Clarence; Owsley, Frank Lawrence; Ransom, John Crowe; Tate, Allen; Wade, John Donald; Warren, Robert Penn; Young, Stark (1930), "Introduction: a statement of principles", I'll Take My Stand.
- Rubin, Louis D. Jr. (1979). "I'll Take My Stand". In Roller, David C.; Twyman, Robert W. (eds.). The Encyclopedia of Southern History. Baton Rouge and London: Louisiana State University Press. p. 618. ISBN 978-0-8071-0575-7.
