= Ode: Sung on the Occasion of Decorating the Graves of the Confederate Dead at Magnolia Cemetery, Charleston, S.C., 1867 =

1866 poem by Henry Timrod

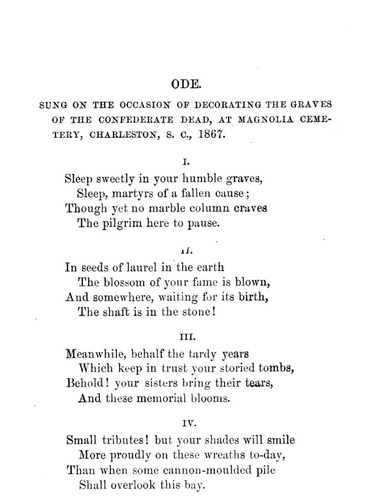
First page of the poem, as collected in 1873

"Ode: Sung on the Occasion of Decorating the Graves of the Confederate Dead at Magnolia Cemetery, Charleston, S.C., 1867" is the full title of a poem by Henry Timrod, sometimes considered the "Poet Laureate of the Confederacy". It was first sung at Magnolia Cemetery in Charleston, South Carolina on Saturday, June 16, 1866, on the occasion of the memorial service held there in honor of the Confederate soldiers who died during the Civil War. The poem is often referred to simply as the "Ode".

== History ==
The presentation at Magnolia Cemetery coincided with the four-year anniversary of the Battle of Secessionville. The cemetery included some 600 dead Confederate soldiers and its dedication was an important enough occasion that shops closed before noon and several thousand attended in spite of heavy rain.

After its presentation on June 16, 1866, it was published two days later on June 18 in the Charleston Courier. Its editors called it "beautiful and soul-stirring". A slightly altered version was published in the Daily South Carolinian on June 19 and a more substantially revised version was published in the Courier on July 23.

Timrod's painstaking rewriting of this poem shows in the differences between the early version, which is standard in anthologies, and revisions published in The Daily South Carolinian and the Charleston Mercury in June and July 1866.

== Analysis ==
This poem, composed within two years of Timrod's death, shows enormous restraint in a venue that could hardly have been more highly charged with emotion. Many critics have considered it one of his finest works, going so far as to call it his swan song.

== See also ==
Texts on Wikisource:

- Ode: Sung on the Occasion of Decorating the Graves of the Confederate Dead at Magnolia Cemetery, Charleston, S.C., 1867
