= Sidney Lanier Cottage =

Historic house in Georgia, United States

- U.S. National Register of Historic Places
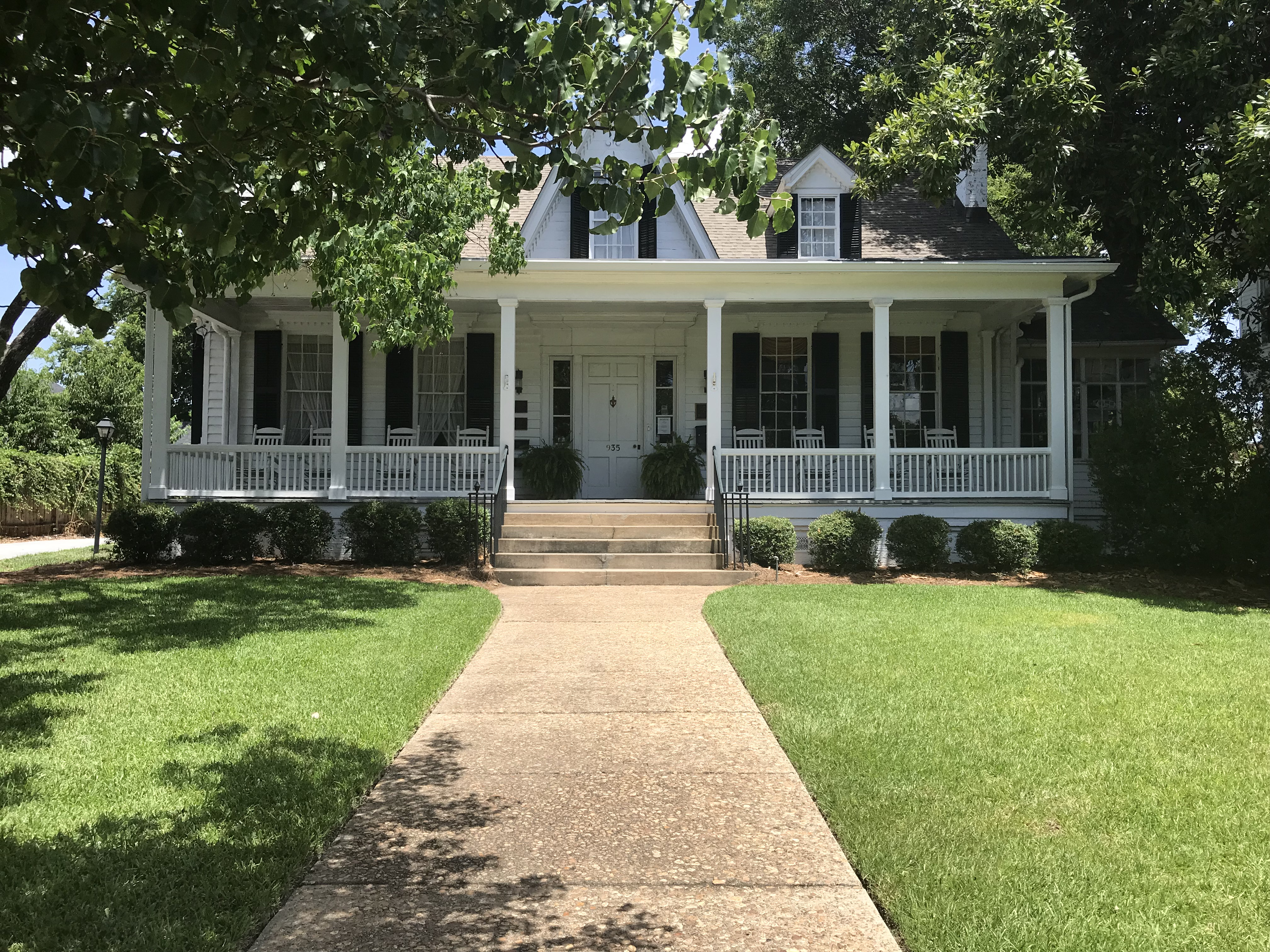

- Location within Georgia Location within the United States
- Location: 935 High St., Macon, Georgia
- Coordinates: 32.83753°N 83.63629°W
- Area: less than one acre
- Built: 1840, 1880
- Architectural style: Gothic Revival
- NRHP reference No.: 72000365
- Added to NRHP: January 31, 1972

The Sidney Lanier Cottage is a historic cottage on High Street in Macon, Georgia, that was the birthplace of poet, musician, and soldier Sidney Lanier. Sidney Lanier Cottage was purchased by the Middle Georgia Historical Society in 1973, and opened to the public in 1975. Until 2021, the Sidney Lanier Cottage served as a museum, event space, and home of the Lanier Center for Literary Arts. The Historic Macon Foundation sold the cottage and it has since been restored as a single family residence.

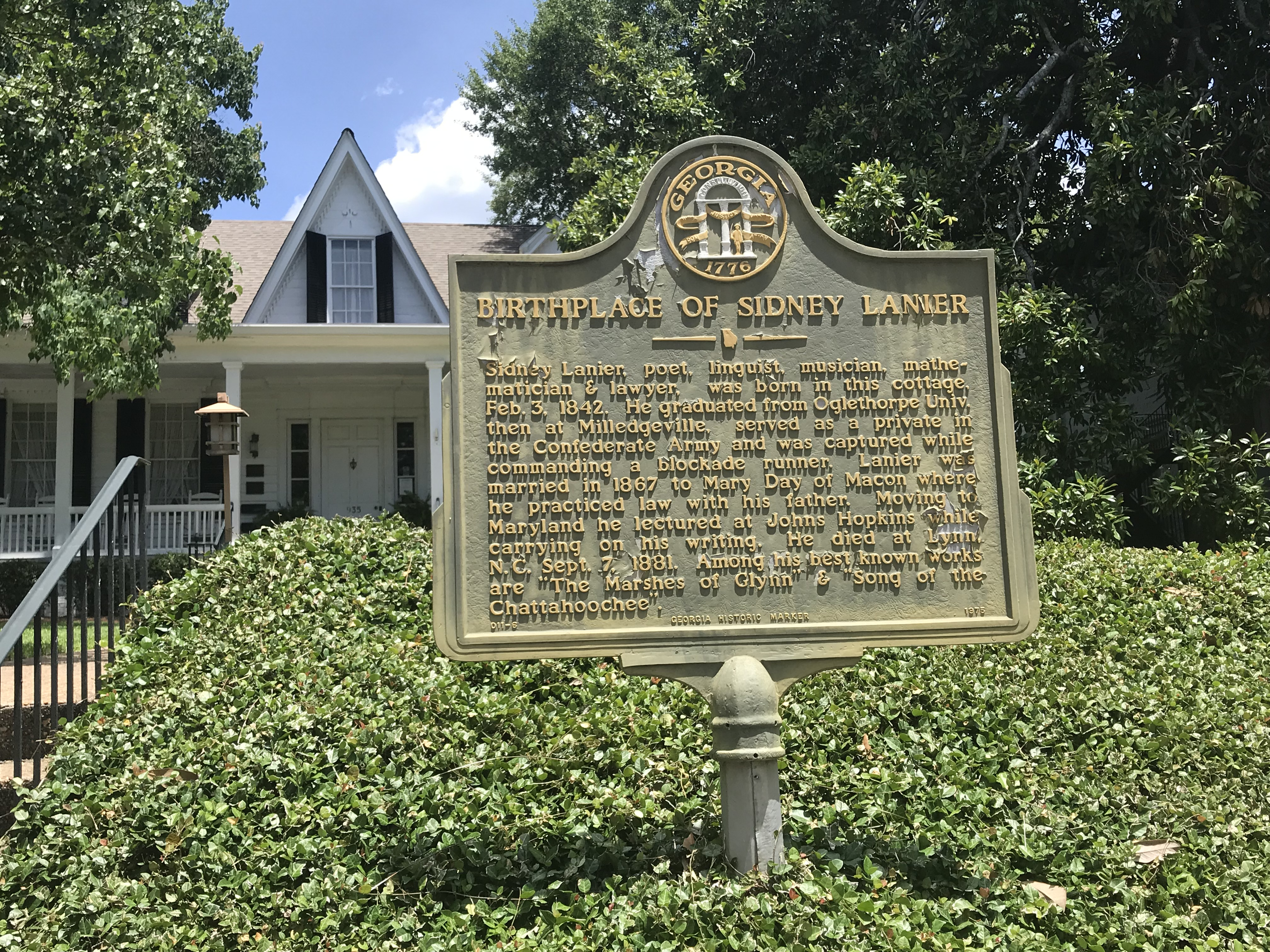
The Birthplace of Sidney Lanier historical marker

== History ==
Sidney Lanier (1842-1881) was born in the High Street home of his grandfather, Sterling Lanier. Lanier is best known for his regional poems, including The Marshes of Glynn, The Song of the Chattahoochee, and Sunrise. Lanier's parents, Sterling Robert Sampson Lanier and Mary Jane Anderson Lanier, were living in nearby Griffin, Georgia, but Mary Jane went to the home of her in-laws in Macon to give birth to her first child.

The white frame Victorian home was built in 1840 as a four-room cottage, though it was altered extensively over the years. In 1879, the building was moved fifty feet and the family added two rooms to the second floor as well as a porch. The home was renovated to its present Gothic Revival style in 1880.

The Sidney Lanier Cottage was listed on the National Register of Historic Places in 1972. It became a Landmark of American Music in 1976 and in 2004 became a Landmark of American Poetry.

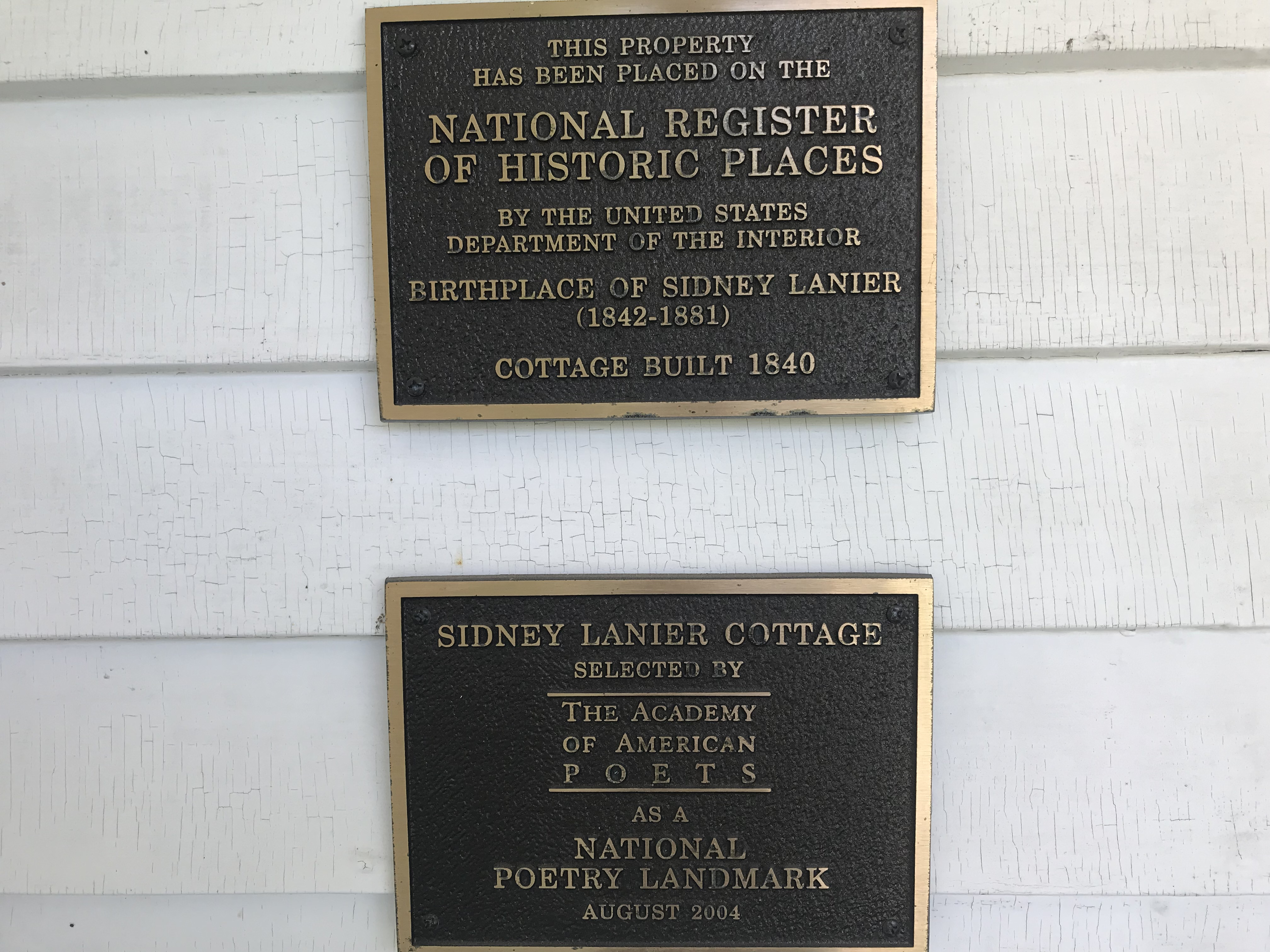

== Museum Years ==
The home served as a private residence for many years before its purchase by the Middle Georgia Historical Society in 1973. Sidney Lanier Cottage was opened to the public in 1975. Now part of the Macon Historic District, the Sidney Lanier Cottage included various artifacts representing the author's life and work, including the silver alto flute that he used while playing for Baltimore's Peabody Orchestra and first editions of his books. Also included in the museum was a wedding dress from 1867 that belonged to Mary Day, Lanier's wife, and photographs of the couple. The museum was operated by the Historic Macon Foundation.

Before it was converted back to a private residence in 2021, the museum operated Monday through Saturday from 10 until 4. Guided tours were available on Fridays and Saturdays, with the last tour being held at 3:30. The Sidney Lanier Cottage was rented out for various activities, such as weddings and corporate events.

The Historic Macon Foundation decided to organize the Lanier Center for Literary Arts. Sidney Lanier Cottage has hosted book signings and writers' workshops, entitled Sidney's Salon.
