= Richard Malcolm Johnston =

American educator and author

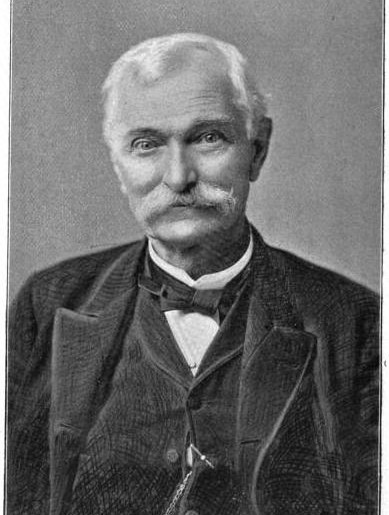
- Born: March 8, 1822; Powelton, Georgia, U.S.
- Died: September 23, 1898 (aged 76); Baltimore, Maryland
- Education: Mercer University
- Occupations: Educator, author

Richard Malcolm Johnston (March 8, 1822 – September 23, 1898) was an American author.

== Biography ==
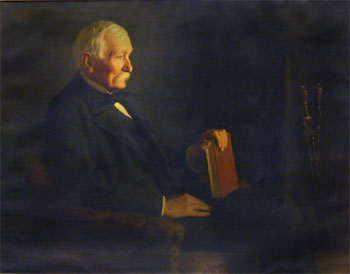
Richard Malcolm Johnston

Johnson was born in Powelton, Hancock County, Georgia. His father was a Baptist minister, and his early education was received at a country school and finished at Mercer University. After graduating there he spent a year teaching and then took up the study of law and was admitted to the bar in 1843. In 1857, he accepted an appointment to the chair of belles-lettres and oratory at the University of Georgia in Athens, retaining it until the opening of the Civil War, when he began a school for boys on his farm near Sparta. This he kept going during the war, serving also for a time on the staff of Confederate general Joseph E. Brown, and helping to organize the state militia.

Johnson was a slave owner. Among the people he enslaved was Lucius Henry Holsey, who would go on to become a bishop in the Methodist church.

At the close of the war he moved to Maryland, where he opened the Pen Lucy School for boys in Baltimore. One of his teaching staff was Georgia-born poet Sidney Lanier, who persuaded him to begin to write for publication, although he was then more than 50 years old. His first stories were sent to Southern Magazine; others to The Century followed, and became immediately popular. His stories presented a nostalgic view of Southern plantation-based slavery that became the foundation of Lost Cause ideology.

He died in Baltimore, Maryland on September 23, 1898.

== Works ==
Johnston's published works include:

- Dukesborough Tales (1871–81), recounting his early school days in Georgia
- Old Mark Langston (1884)
- Two Gray Tourists (1885)
- Mr. Absolom Billingslea and Other Georgia Folks (1888)
- The Primes (1891)
- Widow Guthrie (1890)
- Ogeechee Cross Firings (1889)
- Old Times in New Georgia (1897)
- Life of Alexander H. Stephens (1878), a biography of his partner in a law practice
- Lectures on Literature (1897), on English, French and Spanish. Published for the Catholic Summer and Winter School Library. D.H.McBride & CO., Akron, Ohio

His autobiography was posthumously published in 1900.
