= Little magazine =

Magazine produced without a motive of profit

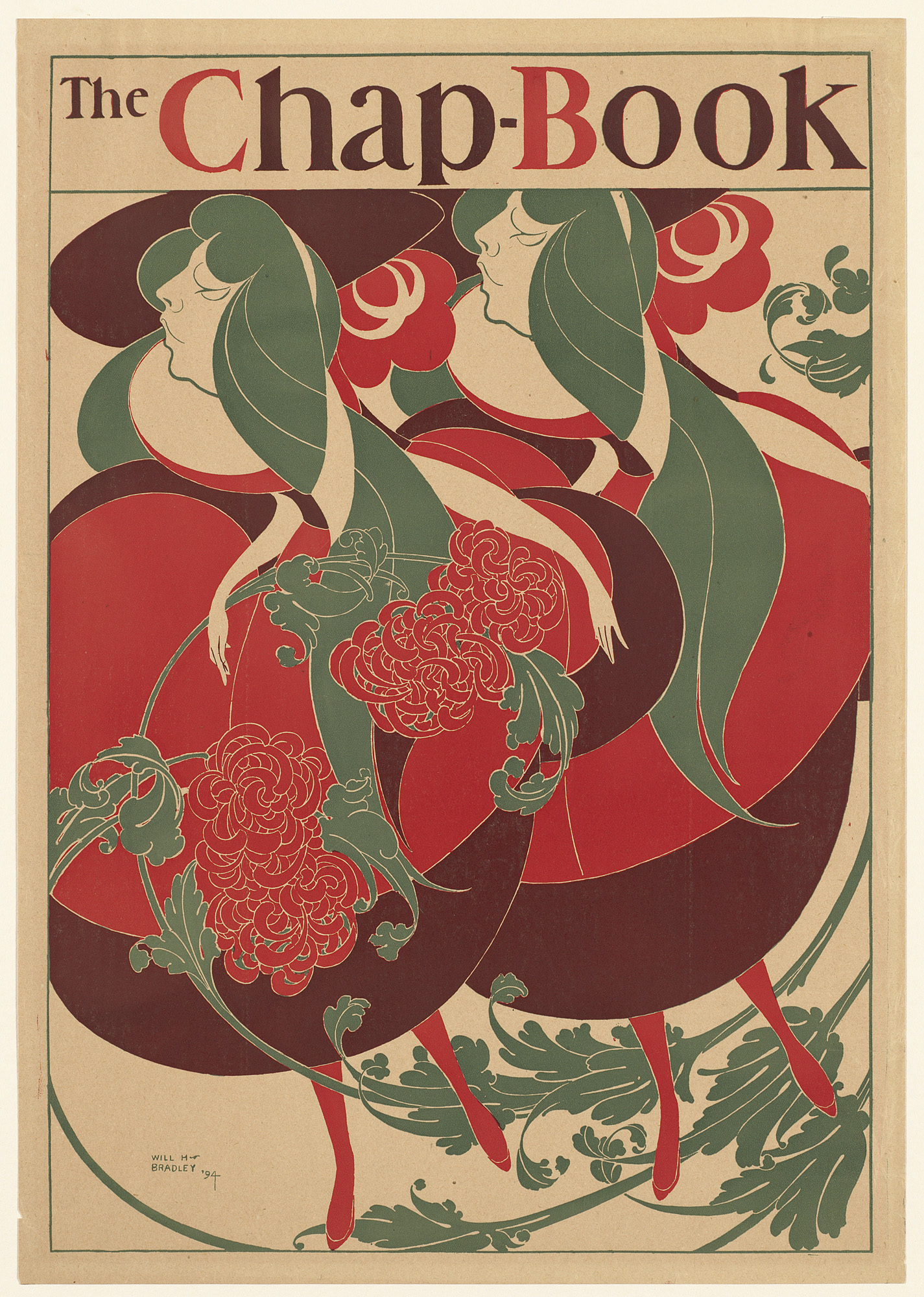
The Chap-Book, a little magazine published c. 1894

In the United States, a little magazine is a magazine genre consisting of "artistic work which for reasons of commercial expediency is not acceptable to the money-minded periodicals or presses", according to a 1942 study by Frederick J. Hoffman, a professor of English. While George Plimpton disagreed with the diminutive connotations of "little", the name "little magazine" is widely accepted for such magazines. A little magazine is not necessarily a literary magazine, because while the majority of such magazines are literary in nature, containing poetry and fiction, a significant proportion of such magazines are not. Some have encompassed the full range of the arts, and others have grown from zine roots.

The traditional characteristics of a little magazine include a 5-by-8-inch (13 cm × 20 cm) format, a two-color cover, and a semi-annual or quarterly publishing schedule. Literary magazines that do not qualify as little magazines for these reasons include Oxford American and the Lindhurst Foundation's Doubletake, measuring 9 by 12 inches (23 cm × 30 cm), having complex four-color covers, and having bi-monthly publishing schedules.

"Integral to the definition of the little magazine", according to scholars Ian Morris and Joanne Diaz, is penury. A later 1978 study by the (then) editors of TriQuarterly magazine described little magazines as putting "experiment before ease, and art before comment" and noting that "[t]hey can afford to do so because they can barely afford to do anything; as a rule they do not, and cannot, expect to make money". Hoffman considered them to be avant-garde, and editor of the Kenyon Review Robie Macauley opined that such magazines "ought to be ten years ahead of general acceptance". Ezra Pound observed that the more a magazine values profits, the less it is willing to experiment with things that are not (yet) acceptable to a mainstream readership.

It has been argued that little magazines that are associated with universities are not truly encompassed by the term, but the majority view amongst scholars is that they have similar enough purposes, formats, and contents to unaffiliated magazines in the genre that they can be considered little magazines also. Historically, they were both devoted to social issues, literature, or critical inquiry, and edited by amateurs.

== Editors ==
Little magazine editors can be characterized as in the main idiosyncratic and dissatisfied with the status quo. The magazines themselves are in general, but with several notable exceptions, short-lived and do not out-last their founding editors. Editors have adopted ingenious, on occasion devious, means to finance their magazines, often financing them out of their own pockets.

== History ==
The earliest significant examples are the transcendentalist publication The Dial (1840–44), edited by Ralph Waldo Emerson and Margaret Fuller, in Boston, and The Savoy (1896), edited by Arthur Symons, in London, which had as its agenda a revolt against Victorian materialism. Little magazines were significant for the poets who shaped the avant-garde movements like Modernism and Post-modernism across the world in the twentieth century.

Originally printed with traditional methods such as offset printing, the publication of little magazines saw a "mimeo revolution" in the 1960s with the advent of the mimeograph, which significantly reduced magazine printing costs. An example of this that also illustrates the devious approach to financing is Keith Abbot. He published Blue Suede Shoes when he was a graduate student at Washington State University, stealing a box of mimeograph paper from the university and borrowing a mimeograph machine from a friend.

In the 1980s a similar revolution occurred as the photocopier superseded the mimeograph, further reducing costs as the availability of commercial photocopying services by companies such as Kinko's obviated the need for editors (or their friends) to own a mimeograph machine. At the same time, university-sponsored magazines became more prevalent, whereas unaffiliated magazines had dominated the genre before the World Wars.

Thousands of little magazines existed across North America by the close of the 20th century, most not fully supporting themselves and subsidized by state or federal grants and endowments from universities, colleges, and foundations, sometimes with unpaid staff.

The desire for low-budget publications brought an on-line revolution to little magazines at the turn of the 21st century. Firstly embracing blogs, they have diversified to Twitter, Facebook, and many other on-line publication channels. The on-line revolution also raised possibilities for content in the form of podcasts and audio-visual content not possible in a purely printed format.

=== In the Southern United States ===
In the U.S. South, postbellum little magazines had non-commercial ends, generally seeking to inform and influence their readers, rather than being marketed for profit, a skill that their amateur editors generally lacked. English professor Bes E. Stark Spangler traced four main phases of the postbellum pre-World War Two little magazine in the South. Immediately after the Civil War they mainly covered Southern topics and the works of Southern authors, changing at the turn of the 20th century into more critical views of Southern letters and life by new young scholars, becoming voices for the advent of modernism in the 1920s, and finally in the 1930s entering into the debate over the future economic prosperity of the South on the side of agrarianism, having heated debates with what they viewed as Southern "liberals".

Examples of the first phase, which were a significant factor in keeping the genre of Southern letters alive for the two decades after the Civil War, include Daniel H. Hill's 1866–1869 The Land We Love, which widened its readership by including agriculture and military history alongside the literature; W. S. Scott's 1865–1869 Scott's Monthly Magazine; Moses D. Hodge's and William Hand Browne's 1866 Eclectic (later to be the 1869 New Eclectic after its absorption of The Land We Love and finally changing to Southern Magazine in 1871); De Bow's Review, an ante-bellum magazine revived briefly in 1866; Albert Taylor Bledsoe's 1867–1869 Southern Review; Mrs Cicero Harris's 1872–1882 The South Atlantic, which, like The Land We Love, augmented literature with science and art coverage; and the 1882–1887 Southern Bivouac, which was one of the last little magazines to be devoted to the Lost Cause.

The second phase, which was a reactionary movement amongst young scholars in Southern colleges and universities that was critical of the South, and which was discussed in the contemporary essays of John B. Hennemann, is exemplified by William P. Trent's 1892 Sewanee Review (which Hennemann was later to edit), which would influence John Spencer Bassett to found the South Atlantic Quarterly in 1902. Both Trent and Bassett were professors, at the University of the South and at Trinity College, respectively, and Bassett in particular was risking his job by publishing, as his magazine directly addressed racial issues in the South and reform, something that his successor toned down, editor Edwin Mims.

The early years of the third phase saw The Westminster Magazine founded in 1911 and affiliated with Oglethorpe University; Stark Young's Texas Review affiliated with the University of Texas, which relocated to Southern Methodist University in 1924 and changed the name to Southwest Review under the editorship of Jay B. Hubbard; the 1921–1926 The Double Dealer; and John Crowe Ransom's and Robert Penn Warren's 1922 The Fugitive published by the Vanderbilt University Group. Other influences for the Southern Renascence were The Lyric and The Nomad, both of which had brief lifetimes in the 1920s.

As young writers from Vanderbilt, the Double Dealer, and others later took up postings in other universities, they would in turn found or edit other magazines, Crowe going on to edit The Kenyon Review, and Ransom together with Cleanth Brooks to found another (1935) Southern Review.

In the final phase, both established magazines like Sewanee Review and the new 1930s little magazines debated whether the South should remain agrarian or embrace industrialism. Also in the 1930s they were associated with New Criticism.

Sewanee Review is now the oldest Southern literary magazine, with other long-lived magazines dating from the 20th century, including Southwest Review (1915), Virginia Quarterly Review (1925), The Southern Review (1935–1942, then from 1965), Georgia Review (1947), Carolina Quarterly (1948), Shenandoah (1950), Nimrod (1956), Southern Poetry Review (1958), Massachusetts Review (1959), Crazyhorse (1960), Southern Quarterly (1962), Hollins Critic (1964), Greensboro Review (1966), Cimarron (1967), Southern Humanities Review (1968), New Orleans Review (1968), and The South Carolina Review (1968).

Many little magazines continued to be founded in the South in the last three decades of the 20th century, from Apalachee Quarterly in 1971 through The Chattahoochee Review in 1980 to Five Points in 1997, still devoted to the core little magazine subject of literature, including short fiction, poetry, book reviews, and creative non-fiction. As The Land We Love did in the 19th century, 20th-century little magazines still received vastly more unsolicited literary contributions than they published, the Atlanta Review for example reporting in 1997 that it received 12,000 submissions for every 100 pieces published.
