= Exchange Hotel, Montgomery =

Former hotel in Alabama, United States

Coordinates: 32°22′39.61″N 86°18′35.63″W

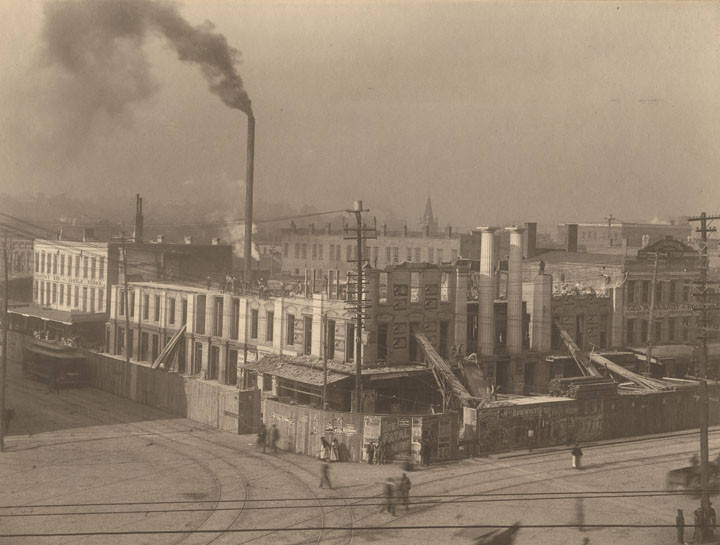
Exchange Hotel, during the 1904 demolition

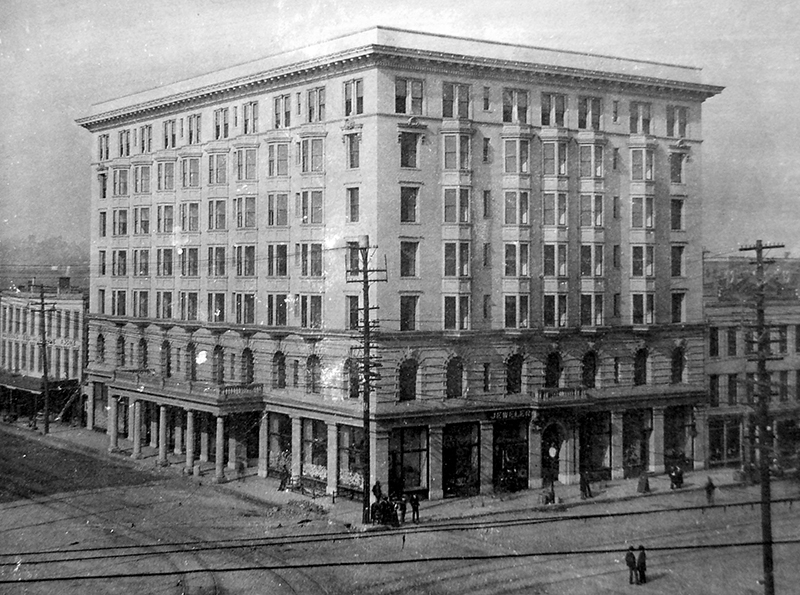
Exchange Hotel, 1909

The Exchange Hotel in Montgomery, Alabama, United States, was a luxury hotel, first built in 1846 and finished in 1847. The hotel burned down in 1904 and was rebuilt in 1906; its second incarnation was demolished in the 1970s. The hotel was a hotbed of politics; during the American Civil War it housed, for a while, the Confederate government, and throughout the 20th century it was the place where politicians and business men met to make deals. Among the early owners were "Messrs. St. Lanier & Son"; Sterling Lanier was the grandfather of Sidney Lanier and his brother Clifford, who both worked at the hotel as clerks. After the Civil War, Clifford managed and co-owned the hotel.

== History ==
The hotel was started by a group of local businessmen who had the company of Robinson and Bardwell build it (they were also responsible for the Alabama State Capitol), with architect Samuel Holt, on the corner of Montgomery and Commerce Streets. The work started in 1846 and was finished in the fall of 1847. When the first State Capitol burned down, on December 14, 1849, the legislature was in session in the Exchange. In 1855, Sterling Lanier (who owned three hotels in the American South) assumed ownership, and a variety of managers followed. William B. Lanier (one of Sterling's sons), and his sister's husband, Abram P. Watt, operated the hotel for a while, with "meetings of the legislature and party conventions contribut[ing] largely to the business of the hotel". On the eve of the American Civil War, Watt had eight enslaved African Americans who labored in the hotel. Clifford Lanier, Lanier's grandson and the brother of poet Sidney Lanier, came into ownership (with an R. L. Watt) in January 1872. Historian Matthew Powers Blue, whose history of the city was published in 1878, noted that "few hotels have as high a reputation, well constructed, well officered, and complete in all of the appointments."

During the American Civil War, when Montgomery (briefly) was the capital of the Confederacy, president Jefferson Davis had his headquarters (and his living accommodations) at the Exchange. Secessionist William Lowndes Yancey introduced Davis to the Montgomery citizens from the hotel balcony on Commerce Street, where he said, "the man and the hour have met", a phrase that was later remembered with a plaque in the hotel. The procession for Davis's inauguration as president of the Confederate States, on February 18, 1861, started at the Exchange, and the order to fire on Fort Sumter was issued by Davis in the Exchange, and then carried over the telegraphic office in the Winter Building, across the street.

Davis continued to patronize the hotel. He was there in April 1879, and spoke there on the piazza. He stopped there again in April 1886, when he was invited to lay the cornerstone for the Confederate Memorial Monument, next to the Capitol, and in his speech made reference to his 1861 introduction to the citizenry of Montgomery. A bronze plaque on the second floor (of the new building) commemorated Davis's sojourn there, and a plaque put up by the Daughters of the Confederacy in 1913, on the side of Montgomery Street, commemorated his inauguration speech.

Sidney Lanier worked at the hotel right after the Civil War, from 1865 to 1867. He was a night clerk, and stories are told of him playing the flute at night; he wrote Tiger-Lilies, his first novel, at the Exchange. One of its guests was W. J. Scott, the editor of the Atlanta-based weekly Scott's Monthly, and after Lanier recognized his name in the register he introduced himself to Scott, who went on to publish a number of Lanier's poems. In 1887, US president Grover Cleveland visited Montgomery, and spoke from the hotel balcony.

The hotel was demolished in 1904. The new Exchange was finished in 1906 (or 1905); the four-story building was replaced by an eight-story building. President Theodore Roosevelt visited the hotel and spoke from the porch, in 1905 and 1912. By 1960, the Lanier family still had a stake in the hotel. It was torn down in 1974, at a time when motels were replacing hotels and Montgomery's nightlife had declined. A "handsome polished granite and glass building" owned by the Colonial Company was built on the site in the mid-1980s.

== Reputation and demise ==
According to local writer and newspaper man Joe Azbell, the hotel started as a locus of power and ended as a "faded rose". It was the place where "determined men walked upon those tile floors, made deals in the chairs of the high-ceiled lobby, decided the future of Alabama government..., and swapped black bags of payoff dough for laws, for fat contracts, for jobs and appointments, and those slight political favors that the yokels back home would never know about". The Ku Klux Klan gathered there to "thwart the mongrelization of the races"; Imperial Emperor Lycurgus Spinks was there in the early 1950s, "doing mouth-to-mouth resuscitation on a corpse of a cause" and holding meetings with dozens of robed Klansmen. Azbell also noted it was a wedding destination in the mid-20th century. But when Alabama governor Gordon Persons (who had advertised his political career in the Exchange and whose campaign mastermind organized it from the Exchange) built Montgomery's Southern Bypass, the demise of the Exchange was certain, since the hotel's guests would start using motels on the bypass. In its heyday, it was host to "congressmen, senators, commissioners, mayors, city commissioners" who used the hotel as a "political tool". It was also a place where the police department's vice squad would regularly entrap prostitutes who plied their business in the hotel rooms. A national chain, Milner Hotels, took over the hotel in 1966 and set it up for permanent residents, and for workers with railroad and bus companies. Nevertheless, the building was demolished eight years later.
