= Francis Orray Ticknor =

American physician and poet

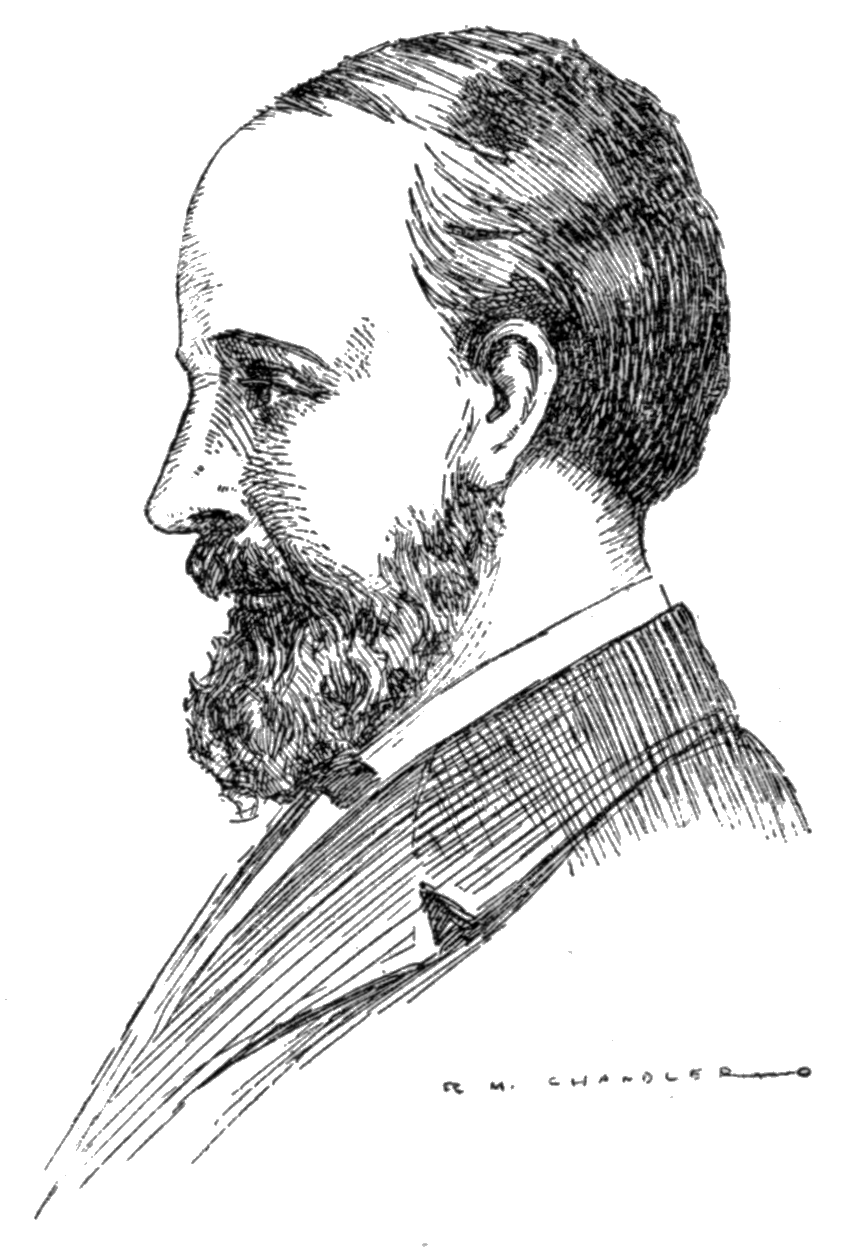
This portrait of Ticknor was taken from a sketch done by his granddaughter Michelle Cutliff Ticknor, and published in Maurice Garland Fulton's Southern life in Southern literature where it headed a short collection of some of Ticknor's poems.

Francis Orray Ticknor (November 13, 1822 – December 18, 1874) was an American medical doctor and poet. From the state of Georgia, he became known as a war poet ("Georgia's Confederate Poet"), mostly through the fame he acquired with the ballad Little Giffen.

== Biography ==
Francis Orray Ticknor was born on November 13, 1822, in Fortville, Georgia, the youngest of three children born to Harriot Coolidge and Orray Ticknor. His parents came from Connecticut, where his father, Orray Ticknor, was a doctor. Orray Ticknor moved to Savannah, Georgia, in 1815, and married Harriot Coolidge, whose family had moved from Connecticut to Georgia around 1800. The family moved to Fortville, where they raised a family.

At age 13, Ticknor left for Pennsylvania where he attended a boys school, and then the Philadelphia College of Medicine (later Gettysburg College) where he got his degree in medicine in 1842. In 1844 he started a practice as a country doctor in Shell Creek, Georgia, a very quiet and rural place where Ticknor found himself missing the social life of bigger towns, though his practice seems to have thrived. He married his wife Rosalie Nelson in 1847. They had eight children (two of them died young) and moved to Columbus, on a hill called Torch Hill and a house named for the hill.

Ticknor's first published writings were on horticulture, and at least by 1858 he was publishing letters in Southern Cultivator. He farmed and worked with fruit trees and flowers; he also opposed state aid for agriculture. He wrote fifty-one letters to the Cultivator between 1857 and 1870, twenty-six of them about horticulture. All were in a recognizable style, mixing formal and informal writing; he enjoyed punning, and many of them had "a charming air", according to assistant professor of English at the Georgia Institute of Technology Allan Andrews Brockman. Paul Hamilton Hayne described him in a letter in 1871 to Margaret Junkin Preston as "[s]uch a fellow for 'quips' and 'Quirks' and odd 'pellets of the brain'; for grotesque phantasies and preposterous puns". His correspondences with others revealed, in the words of Clement Eaton, "an earthy sense of humour", as he talked of riding out on his horse Kitty to minister to poor people, sometimes paid in cash, and sometimes unpaid; he once recounting attending the sheriff's sale of the property of someone who had failed to pay his bill: a cow and calf, a table, two chairs, a handle-less coffee mill, a pan with holes in, and some soap, the sale of which yielded less than US$5.

Four of his letters to the Cultivator were about peach trees, one of which addressed a treatise on greenhouses for cultivating fruit written by Thomas Rivers. Humorously, Ticknor expressed his regret that he could not thank Rivers by sending him a Shanghai peach to grow, Ticknor opining that Chinese fruit varieties grew well in the soils of Georgia, which would grow rapidly to fill Rivers's greenhouse and "knock to shivers / the house of Rivers". He also wrote on the subject of apples, which he also commended as a good fruit to cultivate in Georgia, although he commented that the enthusiastic descriptions by Georgian farmers of their trees often fell far short of the dismal reality that he found growing on farms, albeit that he blamed the farmers rather than the suitability of the fruit for this state of affairs. After the Civil War he proposed that growing grass was Georgia's future, saying that "here and here, only, lies the foundation of future prosperity", with a plan that half the state grow grassland for cattle to graze on, a quarter grow hay grass, and the remaining quarter grow grain and cotton.

== Poetry ==
He favored secession, but in an 1861 poem urged his readers to pray for peace. Ticknor also began publishing his poetry, and wrote a large number of poems honoring the Confederacy and its leaders, and in some of his poems argued against Reconstruction and the policies of Ulysses S. Grant and Congress. After the Civil War, he gained recognition as a poet with Little Giffen of Tennessee, a poem about a Civil War soldier from Tennessee. Ticknor was a physician at the Confederate Hospital during the Civil War, and tended to the wounded soldier, who left to go back to the battlefield before being cured completely, and presumably died in battle. The poem was published in The Land We Love in November 1867. By 1869 he had established a friendship through correspondence with Paul Hamilton Hayne; his poetry was published by over half a dozen (Southern) periodicals.

== Death and legacy ==
Ticknor died, after being ill for a year, on December 18, 1874, and was buried in Old City Cemetery in Columbus. A historical marker is placed at his home, Torch Hill.

Paul Hamilton Hayne was to publish Ticknor's collected poetry posthumously, but was prevented by ill health. He did write the foreword for the first edition of Ticknor's poetry, edited by Kate Mason Rowland and published in 1879. A more complete edition was published in 1911, edited by his granddaughter, Michelle Cutliff Ticknor.

In 1912, the pupils of Columbus High School unveiled marble tablet to Ticknor.

== Critical reception ==
Michelle Cutliff Ticknor compared her grandfather to Henry Timrod, arguing that he was for Georgia what Timrod was for South Carolina. Literary scholar Sarah Cheney explained the similarities:

The Civil War had practically the same effect on Timrod and Ticknor. Both had written poetry for several years before 1861, but that period might be called an apprenticeship for the work they did during the struggle between the North and South. Inspired by the events from 1861 to 1865, they produced the best poetry of their whole lives. The literary reputation of each poet rests almost solely upon his war poetry.

Cheney also observed that little of the scholarship (at least up to 1938) on Ticknor's poetry was original, it either echoing or directly quoting Hayne's opinions.

Little Giffen was his best-known poem, and it was well received by contemporary and some later critics, including C. Alphonso Smith, Barrett Wendell, who included it in his A Literary History of America (1900), and Edwin Mims, who said it was "so vital in its phrasing [that] is destined to outlive all the tributes to the great leaders of the Confederacy". "The Virginians of the Valley" follows in popularity; it was highly praised by Hayne, who thought it superior to James Russell Lowell's ode to Virginia. His war poetry celebrates Confederate victories and laments the losses, and pays tribute to well-known Southern leaders. The setting of "The Virginians of the Valley" is taken from William Alexander Carruthers's The Knights of the Horse Shoe. Only a few poems from after the war criticize Reconstruction.

Outside of his war poetry, his other poetry did not find favor with his critics—"Sentimentalized morality, facile imitation of Tennyson or Poe or Longfellow, coy cheerfulness, and a colloquial brightness characterize most of the works unrelated to the war", according to W. Brock and Ward Pafford, writing in 1951.

=== Scholarship ===
Studies of Ticknor are confined to Southern publications. An unsigned obituary appeared in the Southern Cultivator in 1875. In 1934, Sarah Cheney published a biographical article on Ticknor in the Georgia Historical Quarterly (Cheney 1938). W. Brock and Ward Pafford published a short article called "Georgia's First Confederate Poet" in 1951, in a publication of Emory University. Allan A. Brockman was working on a biography of Ticknor in 1953; he published an article in Georgia Historical Quarterly, on Ticknor's correspondence with the Southern Cultivator in 1966 (Brockman 1966), which was also the subject of his Ph.D. dissertation at the University of Pennsylvania. A short biography was published together with one on Abram Joseph Ryan and selections from their poems in 1963, by Morris Scott, Jr., with Macon's Southern Press. Ticknor and three other Georgia doctors are discussed in a 1973 article by Steve Gurr, called "Contributions to Social History by Some Georgia Physicians".

In 1933, E. D. Hess of the Alabama Polytechnic Institute (now Auburn University) was writing a thesis on Ticknor. In 1934, H. L. Boyd of Peabody College was working on a doctoral thesis on Ticknor, but switched to "English Grammar in American Schools from 1850 to 1890" the year after.
