= South Atlantic (disambiguation) =

The South Atlantic is the portion of the Atlantic Ocean which lies south of the Equator.

South Atlantic may also refer to:

- South Atlantic (magazine), an American magazine from 1877–1882
- South Atlantic Anomaly, where the inner Van Allen belt island closest to the Earth's surface
- South Atlantic Autonomous Region of Nicaragua, now the South Caribbean Coast Autonomous Region
- South Atlantic Blockading Squadron, see: Union blockade
- South Atlantic City, New Jersey, see: Margate City, New Jersey
- South Atlantic Coastal Plain, see: Atlantic coastal plain
- South Atlantic Conference, American college athletic conference
- South Atlantic convergence zone, elongated axis of clouds, precipitation and convergent winds
- South Atlantic Current, eastward flowing ocean current, fed by the Brazil Current
- South Atlantic elephant-seal, see: southern elephant seal
- South Atlantic English, variety of the English language spoken on islands in the South Atlantic Ocean
- South Atlantic Flash, see: Vela incident
- South Atlantic Football Association, see: Dixie League (football)
- South Atlantic High, semipermanent pressure high centred at about 25°S, 15°W
- South Atlantic Intercollegiate Athletic Association, former American intercollegiate athletic conference
- South Atlantic Intercollegiate Sailing Association, district in the American Intercollegiate Sailing Association
- South Atlantic Invasive Species Project, three-year project (2006–2009) funded under the European Union EDF 9
- South Atlantic Investment Corporation Building, historic site in Jacksonville, Florida, United States
- South Atlantic League, or "Sally League", American baseball league
- South Atlantic Medal, campaign medal awarded to British military personnel and civilians for service in the 1982 Falklands War
- South Atlantic Peace and Cooperation Zone, created in 1986 through a UN resolution on Brazil's initiative
- South Atlantic Petroleum, Nigerian oil and gas exploration and production company
- South Atlantic Race, yacht race from Cape Town to various destinations in South America
- South Atlantic Squadron, component of the US Navy until the early 1900s
- South Atlantic States, one of nine American Census Bureau Divisions
- South Atlantic Station, former operational area of the British Royal Navy
- South Atlantic tropical cyclone, unusual weather event originating in the South Atlantic Ocean
- South Atlantic War, see Falklands War
