= David Michael Frank =

- Born: December 21, 1948 (age 77); Baltimore, Maryland, U.S.
- Genres: Film score
- Occupations: Composer, orchestrator, conductor
- Years active: 1965–present

David Michael Frank (born 21 December 1948) is an American composer, music arranger, and conductor who has written musical scores for over 80 films and hundreds of primetime television episodes, earning four Emmy Award nominations. He is particularly known for his work in the action genre, having composed the scores for several Steven Seagal films, including Above the Law, Hard to Kill, and Out for Justice, as well as the cult favorite Showdown in Little Tokyo, starring Dolph Lundgren and Brandon Lee.

David Michael Frank was born in Baltimore, Maryland. He studied piano and composition at the Peabody Conservatory of Music and was soloist at the Peabody Orchestra since the age of 16. In 1978 he moved to California and since then he has become a prolific composer in various genres.

Michael Jackson, around the time of his death, worked with Frank on an album of classical music.

== Awards and nominations ==
- 2009: Primetime Emmy Award nomination for his theme for ABC's The Mole
- 1999: Primetime Emmy Award nomination for music in You Lucky Dog
- 1996: Primetime Emmy Award nomination for Outstanding Music Composition For A Miniseries, Movie Or A Special (Original Dramatic Score) Annie: A Royal Adventure!
- 1990: Primetime Emmy Award nomination for Outstanding Music Direction - "Sammy Davis Jr. 60th Anniversary Celebration" (Outstanding Achievement in Music Direction)
