= Sidney Lanier Monument =

Public monument in Atlanta

Coordinates: 33.78605°N 84.37494°W

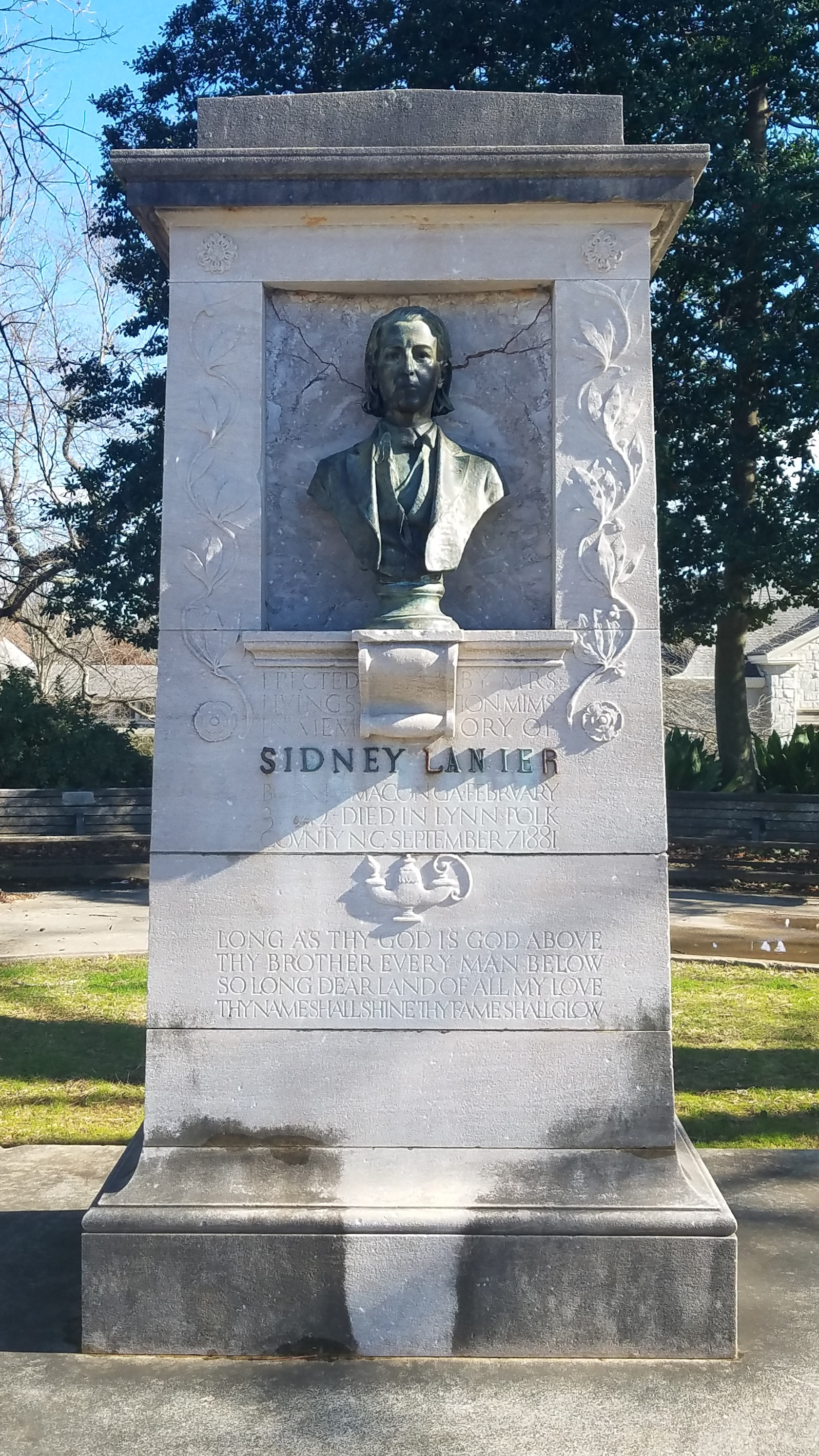
- Sidney Lanier Monument (2020)
- Interactive map of Sidney Lanier Monument
- Location: Piedmont Park, Atlanta, Georgia, United States
- Designer: Carrère and Hastings; Edward Clark Potter (bust)
- Dedicated date: 1914
- Dedicated to: Sidney Lanier

The Sidney Lanier Monument is a public monument in Atlanta, Georgia, United States. Located in Piedmont Park, the monument consists of a bust of Sidney Lanier, a notable poet from Georgia. The monument was dedicated in 1914.

== History ==
Sidney Lanier was a poet from Georgia who was born in Macon in 1842. After graduating from Oglethorpe University in 1860, he served as a private in the Confederate States Army during the American Civil War. Following the war, Lanier, an accomplished flutist, played for the Peabody Symphony Orchestra in Baltimore and published some of his most famous poems, such as "The Marshes of Glynn". Lanier died at the ripe age of 39 due to tuberculosis he had contracted while he was a prisoner of war. After his death, he was honored with numerous memorials, such as in the name of Lanier County, Georgia and Lake Lanier.

The monument was erected in 1914 by the Piedmont Park Association. Sue Harper Mims, the wife of Atlanta Mayor Livingston Mims, funded the monument's creation and erection, having sold some of her jewels to raise the money. The monument was designed by Carrère and Hastings while the bust of Lanier was designed by Edward Clark Potter. Following the monument's dedication, it became the subject of numerous acts of vandalism in the following years, with a popular college prank among students in Atlanta being to remove the bust from the monument. The bust was eventually removed and relocated to Oglethorpe University in 1985.

In February 2012, a replica of the original bust was installed on the monument. The restoration, which took two years, was led by the Atlanta Preservation Center, with the newly restored monument debuted on February 4. According to The Atlanta Journal-Constitution, the committee behind the restoration decided that the monument was not a Confederate monument, and therefore recommended keeping it in place. However, given his association with the Confederate States of America, numerous discussions of the monument are in the context of other Confederate monuments, including in a report issued by the Atlanta History Center to the government of Atlanta on Confederate monuments and memorials in the city.

== Design ==
The monument is designed in the form of an Egyptian stele, with a recessed area in the front of the monument holding a bust of Lanier. The bust faces west.

== See also ==
- 1914 in art
- List of Confederate monuments and memorials in Georgia
