= Robert Lanier =

Robert Lanier may refer to:

- Robert S. Lanier (1819–1893), American lawyer
- Bob Lanier (1948–2022), American basketball player and coach
- Bob Lanier (politician) (1925–2014), American politician
- Rob Lanier (born 1968), American basketball coach
