= Lucius Henry Holsey =

American bishop (1842–1920)

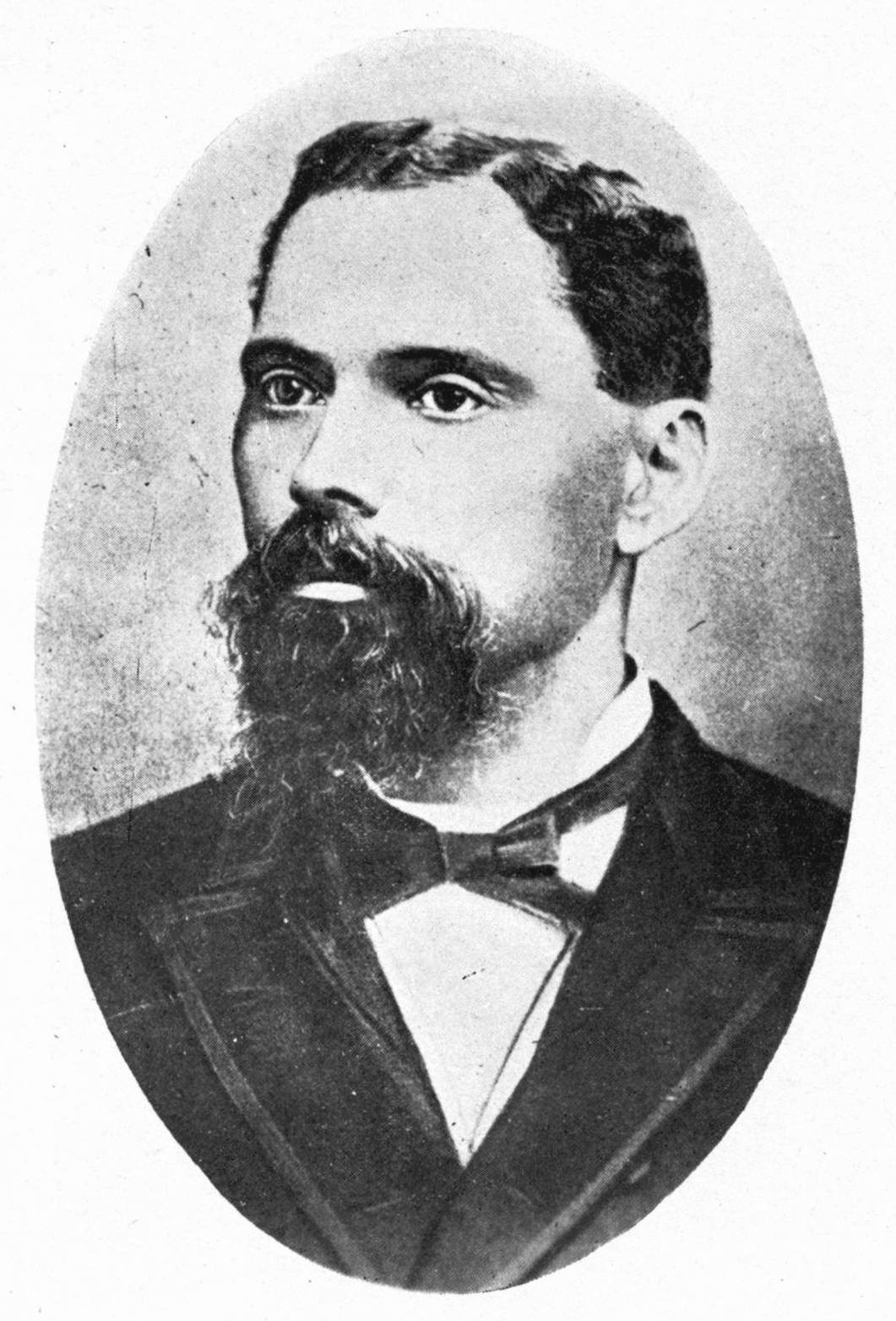
- Lucius Henry Holsey circa 1919
- Born: July 3, 1842; Near Columbus, Georgia, U.S.
- Died: August 3, 1920; Atlanta, Georgia, U.S.

Lucius Henry Holsey (July 3, 1842 – August 3, 1920) was an American bishop, editor, church founder, and fundraiser for schools.

== Early life and education ==
Lucius Henry Holsey was born on July 3, 1842, near Columbus, Georgia. His mother Louisa was enslaved. His father James Holsey owned the plantation. Lucius was born enslaved.

He was sold to his cousin T. L. Wynn and then to Richard Malcolm Johnston, an academic. According to the New Georgia Encyclopedia, Holsey chose to be sold to Johnston. According to American National Biography, Holsey taught himself to read and write and was not educated; according to the New Georgia Encyclopedia, some of Holsey's relatives taught him to read. He remained a slave owned by the Johnston family until slavery was abolished.

== Career ==
Holsey converted to Methodism after attending plantation missionary revivals led by Henry McNeal Turner. He was given a preaching license as a Methodist minister in February 1868 and held various positions as a minister until he was appointed a bishop of the Colored Methodist Episcopal Church (now the Christian Methodist Episcopal Church) in March 1873. The Colored Methodist Episcopal Church was a division of the Methodist Episcopal Church, South, created for Black people in the year 1870 during the Reconstruction era.

As a bishop, Holsey founded churches, wrote and revised religious texts including the church's Book of Discipline, and participated in church governance. He also edited a church newspaper, The Gospel Trumpet. He raised funds in support of educational institutions including Paine College; Lane College; Holsey Industrial Institute in Cordele, Georgia; and the Helena B. Cobb Institute for Girls in Barnesville, Georgia.

Initially an advocate for racial cooperation, Holsey endorsed Black separatism around the turn of the 20th century after Sam Hose was lynched in 1899.

In 1898, Holsey published Autobiography, Sermons, Addresses, and Essays with Franklin Printing & Publishing Company in Atlanta, Georgia. It went through three editions.

== Personal life ==
Holsey married Harriett Turner on November 8, 1862, or 1863. Harriett was 15 at the time. Her name is also given as Harriett A. Pearce or Harriet A. Turner. Harriett and Lucius met in Hancock County, Georgia, while classes at the University of Georgia, where Johnston taught, were canceled due to the Civil War. Lucius died on August 3, 1920, at his home on Auburn Avenue in Atlanta.
