= Carrie Jenkins Harris (American writer and editor) =

American writer and magazine editor (1847–1903)

Caroline Aiken Jenkins Harris
- Born: March 27, 1847; Williamsboro, North Carolina
- Died: December 28, 1903 (aged 56); Rockville, Maryland
- Resting place: St. John's Episcopal Churchyard
- Occupation: Writer
- Spouse: Cicero Willis Harris
- Writing career
- Pen name: Charles Edward Lloyd
- Language: English
- Notable work: Margaret Rosselyn

Caroline Aiken Jenkins Harris (March 27, 1847 – December 28, 1903) was an American writer and magazine editor from North Carolina.

== Background ==
Caroline "Carrie" Aiken Jenkins was born on March 27, 1847, possibly on the Jenkins family farm on the outskirts of Williamsboro, North Carolina. Her father owned a tobacco factory, and her mother taught school and was a musician. She was the eldest of ten children of her father's second wife. She may have attended the Henderson Female Academy.

In 1873, Harris was teaching music, drawing, and other arts, at the Wilson Collegiate Institute (a private, non-denominational school in Wilson, North Carolina, run by Sylvester Hassell and was active on stage and as a painter. She married Cicero Willis Harris on July 1, 1874, who came from a family with a long tradition in North Carolina. His interests were more in politics and economics; in addition, his family was Whig, while hers were Democratic, and they seem to have separated by the end of the century. They did live in Wilmington in 1874, and throughout 1875 Harris wrote poetry and "items of general interest" for Our Living and Our Dead, one of many little magazines dedicated to the Lost Cause.

Harris wrote a serialized novel called Margaret Rosselyn, and in November 1877 founded and began editing a magazine, the South Atlantic, which published poetry (including Harris's own), political texts (including by her husband), and various other literary and historical material, such as an account of the formerly enslaved Muslim man, Omar ibn Said from Futa Toro in modern-day Senegal, and work by Paul Hamilton Hayne. Her husband edited the Wilmington Star and the Wilmington Sun, and in 1881 the South Atlantic moved to Baltimore, still edited by Jenkins Harris. By 1888, she had moved to Washington, D.C., and wrote as a free-lancer for New York papers, for $8 per column. In the 1890s she was writing books inspired by the Celtic Revival. She died on December 28, 1903, in Rockville, Maryland, and was buried in Williamsboro.

== Bibliography ==
- Margaret Rosselyn (published serially in Our Living and Our Dead)
- State Trials of Mary Queen of Scots. FB&C Limited. 1899. ISBN 978-1332200283.
- Scots), Mary (Queen of (1899). Sir Walter Raleigh. Creative Media Partners, LLC. ISBN 9781376291247.
- Charles Edward Lloyd (1899). Captain William Kidd. "condensed from Francis Hargrave's 1776 book"
