= Fortville, Georgia =

Unincorporated community in Georgia, U.S.

Coordinates: 33°03′12″N 83°27′27″W

Fortville is an unincorporated community in Jones County, in the U.S. state of Georgia.

== History ==
A post office called Fortville was in operation between 1825 and 1903. The community was named early from a pioneer fort which stood at the site. Variant names were "Old Fort" and "The Fortification".

Country doctor and poet Francis Orray Ticknor (1822–1874) was born in Fortville.
