= Lanier's Oak =

Oak tree in Brunswick, Georgia, United States

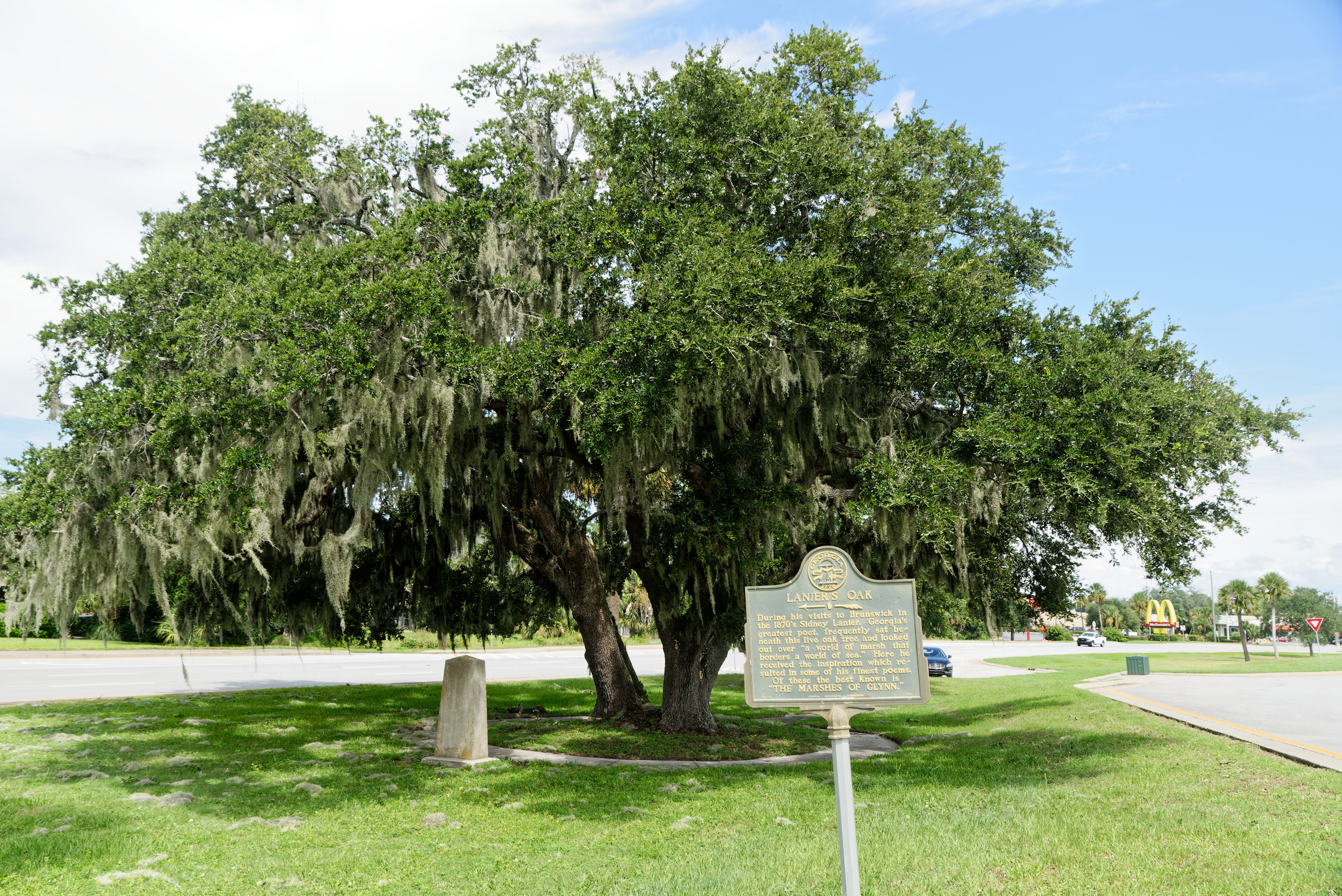
- Lanier's Oak (2019)

- Location within Georgia Location within the United States
- Species: Southern live oak (Quercus virginiana)
- Location: Brunswick, Georgia
- Coordinates: 31.1558°N 81.4791°W

Lanier's Oak is a historic southern live oak tree in Brunswick, Georgia. It is named after poet Sidney Lanier.

== History ==
Sidney Lanier was a Georgian poet active in the post-Civil War Southern United States. Lanier visited Brunswick, Georgia several times in his life, spending time with his wife's family and attempting to alleviate health problems. In the 1870s, during such a visit, Lanier was inspired to write "The Marshes of Glynn", considered one of his most well-known poems, while under the tree, looking out over the marshes. In May 1932, a concrete and bronze marker was erected near the tree, with an inscription containing parts of "The Marshes of Glynn". As part of the unveiling ceremonies, the poem "Trees" by Joyce Kilmer was read aloud. In 1956, the Georgia Historical Commission erected a Georgia historical marker near the tree, giving more context on the tree's significance. Around this same time, land reclamation projects in the area caused the surrounding marsh to recede far from the tree, and today the tree is located in the median strip of U.S. Route 17.

== See also ==
- List of individual trees
- Lover's Oak
