= The Land We Love =

19th-century American magazine

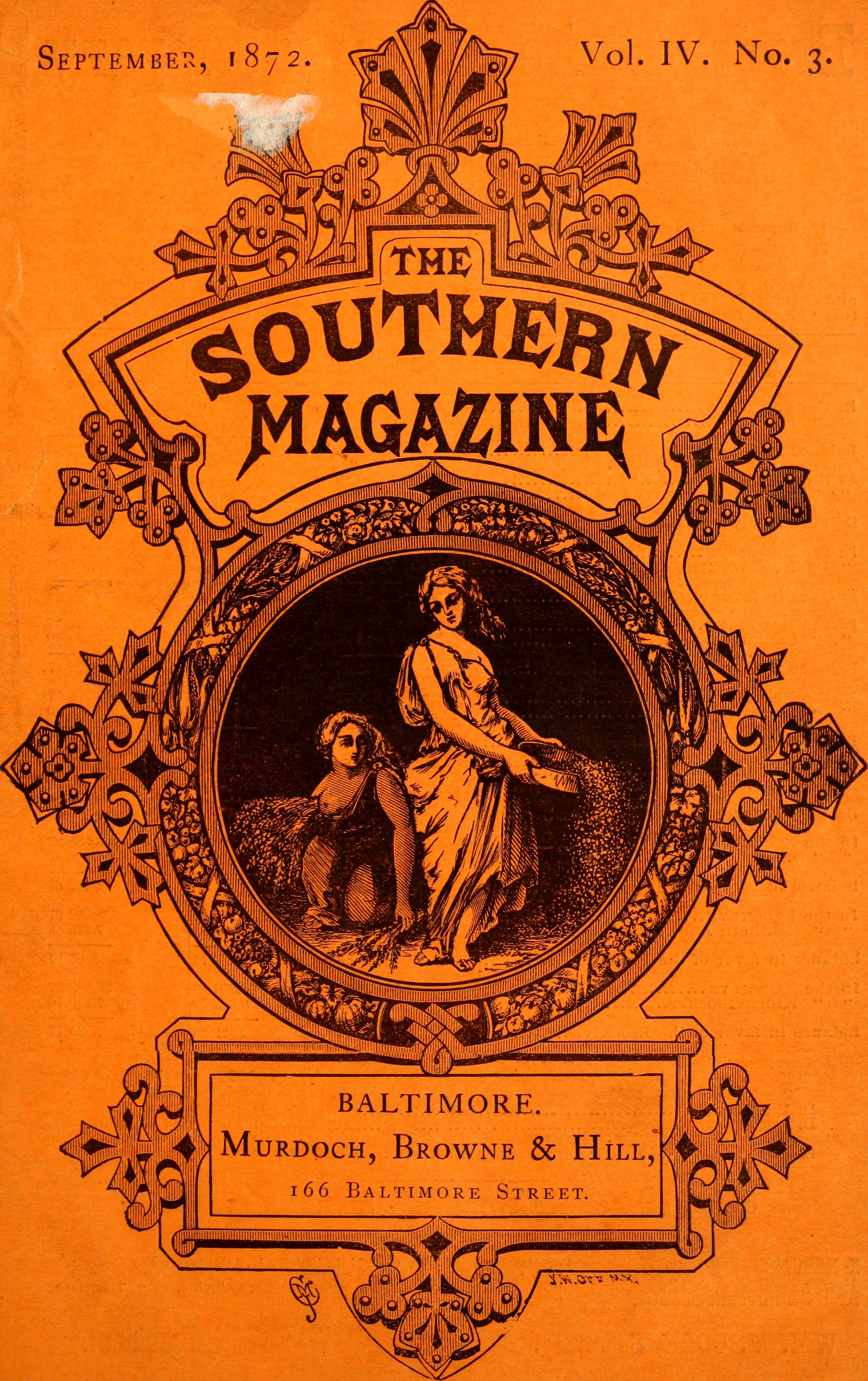
A cover of the magazine from 1872

The Land We Love was an American little magazine. It was founded in May 1866 by Daniel Harvey Hill, a former Confederate general, who edited it until March 1869. The eponymous land was the Southland, and the magazine recounted the South's story of the American Civil War, communicating "a hatred of the North", according to Frank Luther Mott. Hill wrote much of the material; other contributors included Richard Malcolm Johnston, John Reuben Thompson, Francis Orray Ticknor, Paul Hamilton Hayne, and Margaret Junkin Preston. It published fiction, poems, agricultural reports, war stories, travel stories, and camp humor. It claimed 12,000 subscribers in April 1867, but that same year complained of subscribers who didn't pay because, it claimed, of the South's poverty. Hill's publication partners were James P. Irwin and J. G. Morrison.

Hill's editorial stance on the Civil War was moderate in comparison to those of other magazines such as H. Rives Pollard's Southern Opinion, seeking to assuage both sides, but ending up satisfying neither. For its first four issues, the magazine was printed by a New York printer, causing Field and Fireside to remark in 1866 that "This 'Land We Love' is still printed in the land its editor hates," and rumors that the magazine was printed outside of the South continued long after Hill moved publication to Charlotte, North Carolina. Conversely, the Philadelphia Dispatch asserted that it was too "intensely Southern in Sentiment" and that its editor "needs 'reconstructing' badly", which Hill rebutted in several editorials in 1867.

Hill originally desired to publish works by people who had actually fought in the Civil War, but received instead a large number of unsolicited works from amateur poets. Most he rejected, but some he printed. Unusually for such magazines immediately following the Civil War, Hill paid his contributors, and had a good reputation for paying them promptly. Hill sought out contributions from Henry William Ravenel on botanical subjects in a letter to Ravenel dated 26 November 1866, pointing out that "We pay from $2 to $3 per printed page for all accepted articles," adding, "To gentlemen of science, the latter sum always."

Ravenel responded enthusiastically, providing articles in five issues between May 1867 and March 1868. The articles dealt with a wide range of agricultural subjects, from raising peaches and grapes to the function of leaf stomata in plants for regulating water loss. This was a subject that Ravenel knew well, and could write about swiftly and with ease, so the ratio of dollars paid to hours spent writing was favorable. But to Ravenel there were also side-benefits, as exemplified by the response to an article that he wrote on Lespedeza striata. He had observed the plant in South Carolina some two decades earlier, and chose to write about it with his own business interests in mind. In the article he expressed a hope that the plant would prove to grow well during hot summers and thus provide a good source of cattle fodder. In response, readers of the magazine sent to him large numbers of orders for seeds, to the tune of US$0.50 to US$1 per order.

Although Hill himself was no advocate of women's rights and legal reform in that area, the magazine featured the works of many women, including Preston (aforementioned), Mary Bayard Clarke, and Fanny Murdaugh Downing. Issues would commonly include four to five works by women authors (who would, like the male authors, usually be named in the table of contents next to their works), reviews of books by women writers (e.g. Emily V. Mason's Southern Poems of the War) or in favor of women's rights (e.g. Virginia Penny's The Employments of Women reviewed in 1868), and advertisements for women's schools. For white women the magazine was one of many post-bellum magazines that were willing to accept their works.

The Land We Love merged with the New Eclectic in April 1869. The Richmond Eclectic was founded in Richmond, Virginia, in 1866 by Moses D. Hodge and David Hand Browne, taken over in January 1868, renamed New Eclectic, and moved to Baltimore, under the ownership of Fridge Murdoch and Lawrence and H. C. Turnbull. It was renamed into Southern Magazine in 1871, which was published until 1875. It was edited by David Hand Browne.
