= Clifford Anderson =

American politician

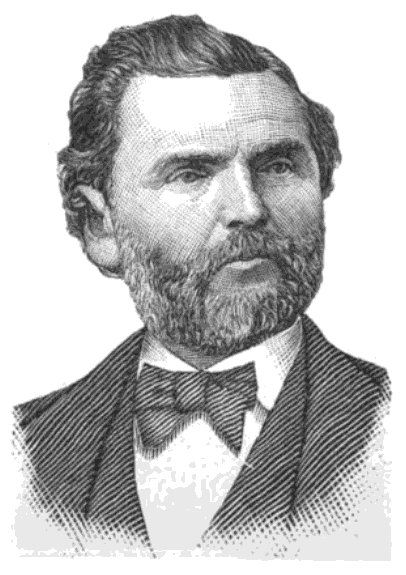

Attorney General of Georgia
- In office 1880–1890

Member of the Confederate House of Representatives
- In office 1864–1865

Member of the Georgia House of Representatives
- In office 1859

Personal details
- Born: March 23, 1833 Nottoway County, Virginia, US
- Died: December 19, 1899 (aged 66) Macon, Georgia, US
- Spouse: Anne LeConte (m. 1857)
- Children: 2
- Occupation: Jurist, politician

Clifford Anderson (March 23, 1833 – December 19, 1899) was a Georgia politician, active in the politics of the state of Georgia and the Confederate States of America.

== Biography ==
Anderson was born in Nottoway County, Virginia. He read law and was admitted to the bar in 1852, forming a partnership with Robert S. Lanier.

He married Anne LeConte in 1857, and they had two children.

He served as a state court Judge in Georgia from 1856 to 1858, and in the Georgia House of Representatives in 1859. He served in the Confederate States Army and represented Georgia in the Second Confederate Congress from 1864 to 1865. After the war, he served as Georgia's Attorney General from 1880 to 1890. From 1877 to 1885, Anderson was Chairman of the Mercer University School of Law faculty.

He died at his home in Macon on December 19, 1899.
