= Lynn, North Carolina =

- Unincorporated community
- Location within North Carolina Location within the United States
- Coordinates: 35°13′42″N 82°14′04″W
- Country: United States
- State: North Carolina
- County: Polk
- Elevation: 912 ft (278 m)
- Time zone: UTC-5 (Eastern (EST))
  - Summer (DST): UTC-4 (EDT)
- ZIP code: 28750
- Area code: 828
- GNIS feature ID: 989146

Lynn is an unincorporated community in Polk County, North Carolina, United States. Lynn is located on North Carolina Highway 108 2.7 miles (4.3 km) southwest of Columbus. Lynn has a post office with ZIP code 28750. Its incorporation was repealed in 1965.
