= Robert S. Lanier =

American lawyer (1819–1893)

- Born: Robert Sampson Lanier; September 22, 1819; Near Athens, Georgia, U.S.
- Died: 1893 (aged 73–74)
- Education: Randolph–Macon College
- Occupation: Lawyer
- Spouses: Mary J. Anderson (m. 1840; died 1865) Anna Morgan (m. 1870)
- Children: 3, including Sidney Lanier
- Military career
- Allegiance: Confederate States of America
- Branch: Confederate States Army
- Unit: Macon Volunteers (honorary member)

Robert Sampson Lanier (September 22, 1819 – 1893) was an American lawyer who lived and practiced in Georgia.

== Early life and education ==
The son of Sterling Lanier and Sarah V. Lanier (née Fullwood), he was born near Athens, Georgia on September 22, 1819.

Sterling, originally of Virginia, was a businessman in Macon who in 1855 moved to the LaFarge Hotel in New York before losing US$100,000 (equivalent to $3,455,357 in 2025) in a fire of uninsured property that he owned.

Robert himself was educated in Georgia and later in Randolph Macon College.

He studied to be a lawyer in Macon, briefly interrupting that study to marry Mary J. Anderson, later passing the bar and setting up the firm in Griffin of Lanier & Clopton with David Clopton, who was later a justice on the Supreme Court of Alabama. His later law practice was the firm of Lanier & Anderson a partnership with Clifford Anderson of over three decades.

Clopton had been his college roommate from 1838 to 1840, and his marriage to Mary on 1840-10-27 in the Little Presbyterian Church of Crewe, Virginia was a double ceremony with another of his college roommates, Clopton's cousin Burwell Kendrick Harrison of Macon, marrying Mary's aunt (only two years older than Mary herself), Elizabeth Woodson Robertson.

== Military career ==
Lanier corresponded with Anderson during the Civil War when the latter was serving with the Confederate States Army in Virginia.

Anderson was a member of the Floyd Rifles, and Lanier was an honorary member of the Macon Volunteers.

Lanier's letter of June 1861, since collected in the papers of Anderson, exemplifies how the fighting had yet to affect Macon and the sense of security and normality felt by the citizens there at the time.

By that time, Lanier owned Lanier House, his father's hotel in Macon.

In the letter he related the recovery of one of his servants, Mary, from an illness allowing her to go and work in the hotel; his difficulty in selling Georgia Ann, one of the people he had enslaved, and that Dave, another, was working in the country; and news of typhoid and scarlet fever outbreaks. He also related his views on President Lincoln and instructed Anderson to avoid eating fried meat because "it will breed disease".

After his capture of Macon four years later, James H. Wilson used the Lanier House Hotel as his personal residence.

== Personal life ==
He had three children by his wife Mary before she died on May 22, 1865: Sidney (1842–1881), Clifford (1844–1908), and Gertrude (1846–1889). His second wife was Anna Morgan of South Carolina, whom he married in 1870.

== Death ==
Robert Lanier died in 1893, and was praised, in an obituary in the Report of Proceedings of the Annual Session of the Georgia Bar Association, for his legal knowledge, his devotion to his clients, and his "catholic" spirit; the writer compared him to "Chevalier Bayard".

== Sources ==
- Dessau, W. (1894). "Sketch of Robert S. Lanier". In Akin, John W. (ed.). Report of the Eleventh Annual Meeting of the Georgia Bar Association. Vol. 4. Georgia Bar Association. pp. 188–192.
- "Robert S. Lanier". Biographical Souvenir of the States of Georgia and Florida. Chicago: F.A. Battey & Company. 1889. pp. 501–503.
- Caknipe, Jr, John (2015). "Go forth and Sow the Fruits of thy Labor". Randolph Macon College in the Early Years: Making Preachers, Teachers and Confederate Officers, 1830–1868. McFarland. ISBN 9781476616025.
- Iobst, Richard William (2009). "Life in Macon During the First Year of the War". Civil War Macon: The History of a Confederate City. Mercer University Press. ISBN 9780881461725.
- Butler, John Campbell (1879). Historical Record of Macon and Central Georgia. American County Histories. Macon, Georgia: J.W. Burke & Company.
