= Ward B. Pafford =

Ward B. Pafford (October 25, 1911 – January 23, 2011) was a chairman of the English Department at Emory University from 1953 to 1958, Dean of Valdosta State University from 1966 to 1971, and fourth president of the University of West Georgia from 1971 until his retirement in 1975.

== Early life and education ==
Pafford was born in Jesup, Georgia to Bascom Anthony Pafford and Jeanette Dukes Pafford. He graduated from Savannah High School. Pafford graduated with A.B. and M.A. degrees from Emory University and a PhD from Duke University.
