= Peabody Orchestra =

Professional orchestra in Baltimore, Maryland, US

- Orchestra
- Founded: 1866
- Disbanded: 1896
- Location: Baltimore, Maryland, U.S.

Formed in 1866, the Peabody Orchestra, was the first professional orchestra in the city of Baltimore. Based at the Peabody Conservatory, its leaders included Lucien Southard, Asger Hamerik and James Monroe Deems. The orchestra premiered several influential works by Americans, as well as providing the first United States performance of several European pieces, especially from Hamerik's own Denmark. Among the Peabody Orchestra's players were flautist Sidney Lanier and pianist Harold Randolph. The orchestra disbanded in 1896.
