= Scott's Monthly =

Scott's Monthly was an American weekly magazine published from 1865 to 1869 in Atlanta, Georgia. Frank Luther Mott lists it as one of the most important magazines published in the South of its time. The magazine was founded by an Atlanta bookseller, W. J. Scott, who edited and published the magazine from December 1865 to December 1869, though the last issue was edited by W. H. Wylly.

The magazine's content included stories of the Civil War, and portraits by George Edward Perine of Robert E. Lee and Jefferson Davis. About a quarter of the content was "selected"; authors published include Maurice Thompson, Sidney Lanier, and Paul Hamilton Hayne. In 1867 it claimed a circulation of over 5,000, mostly in five of the Southern states.
