= The Marshes of Glynn =

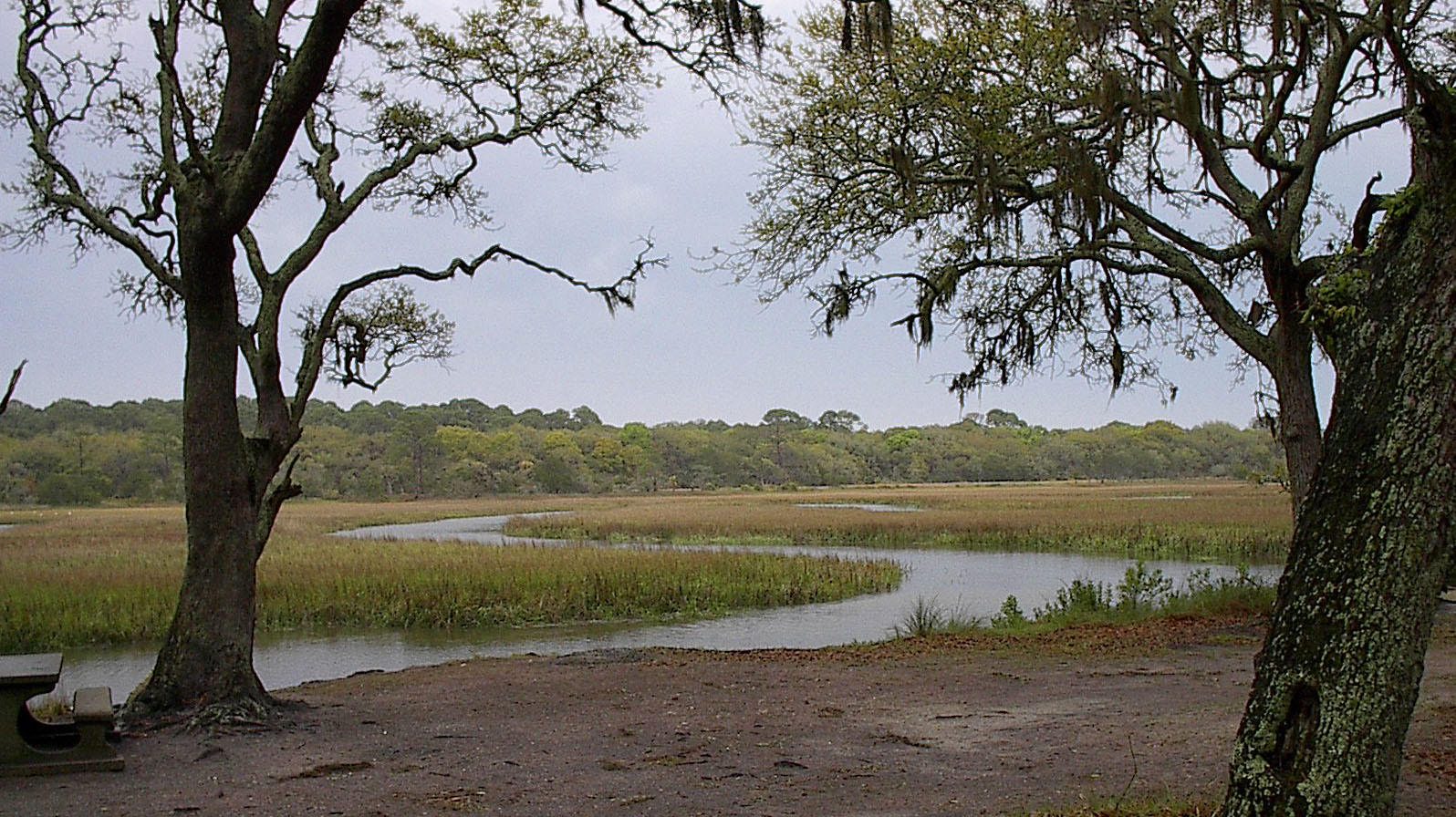
A marsh near Jekyll Island

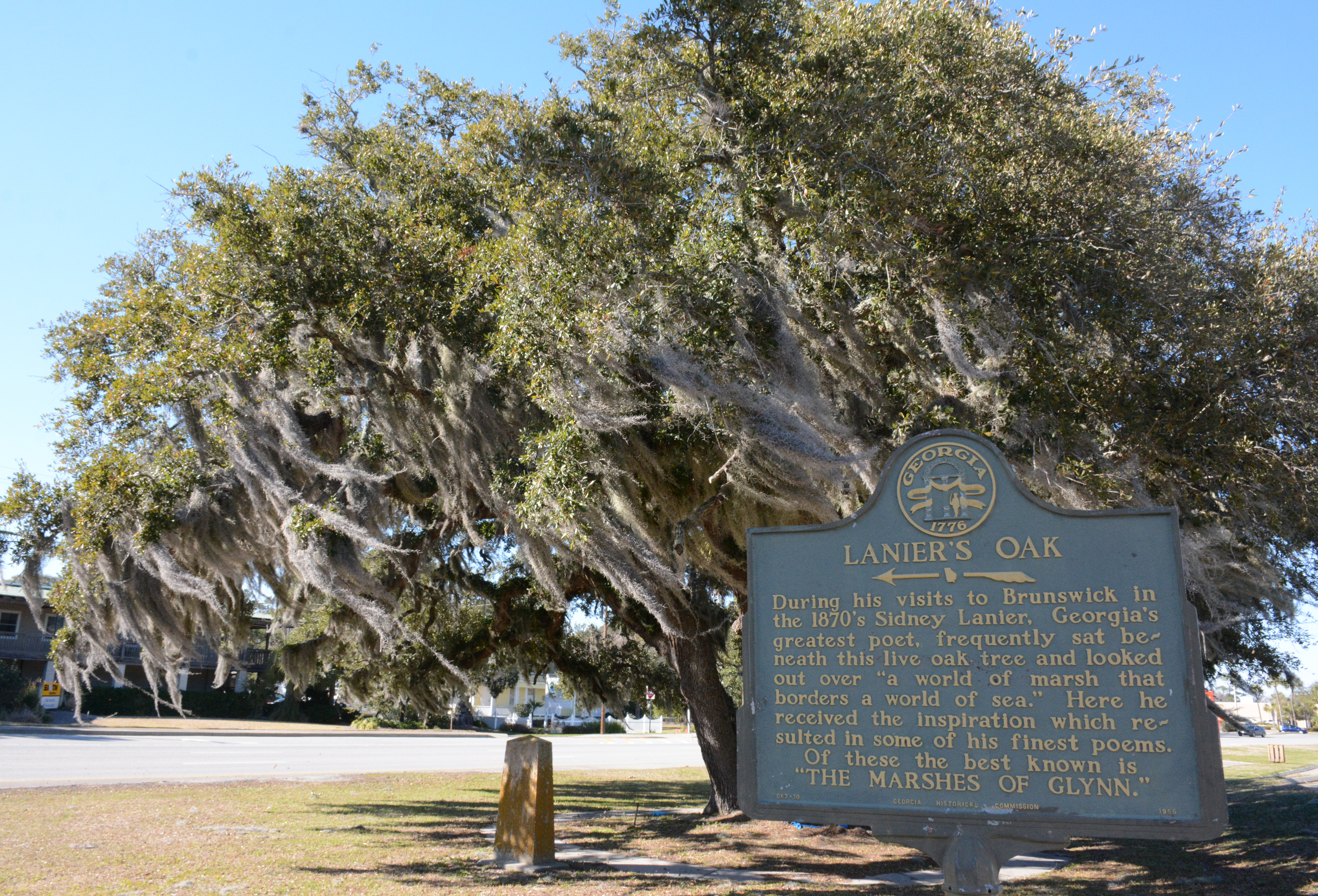
This live oak tree in Brunswick, Georgia is called Lanier's Oak because the poet is said to have often rested beneath it to gaze at the marshes.

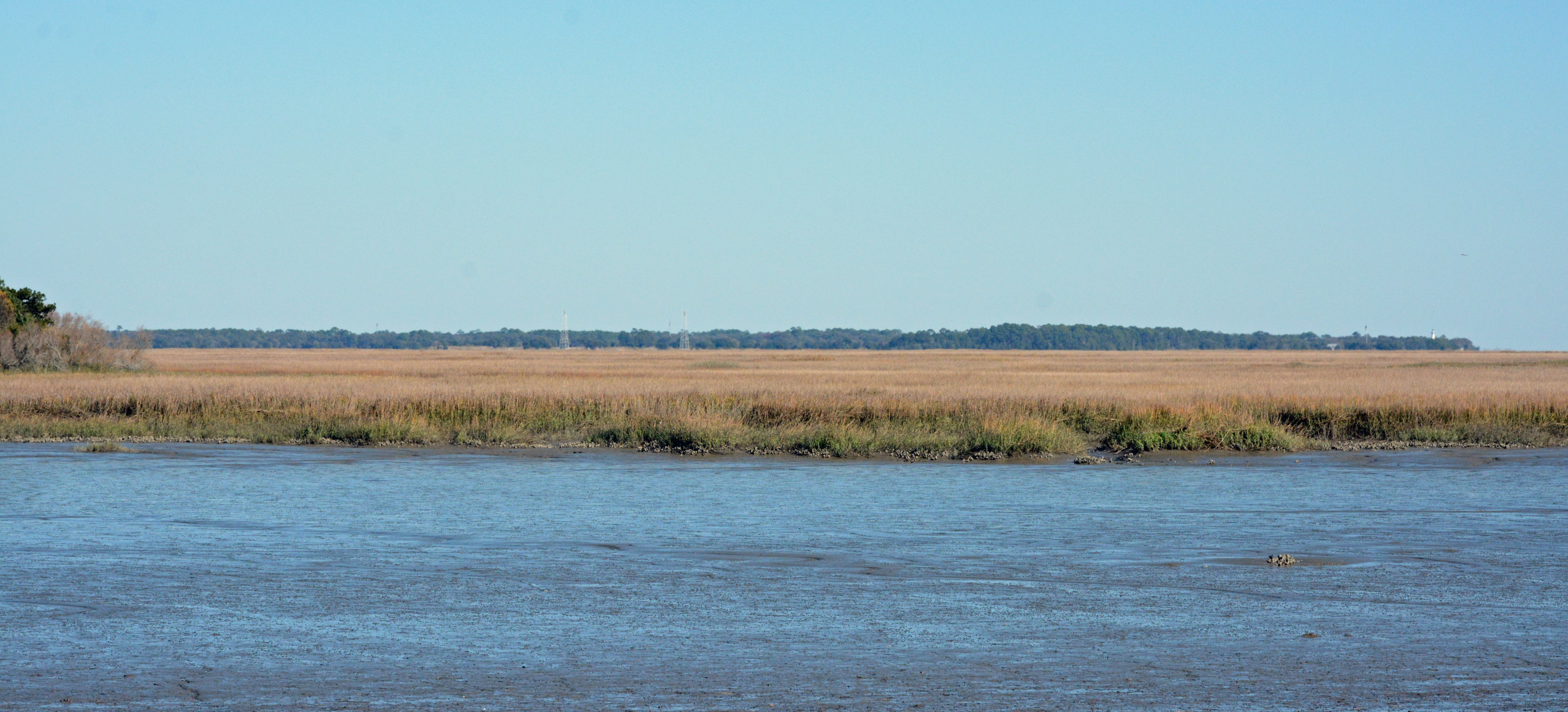
The Marshes of Glynn, as seen from Brunswick, Georgia, USA. The trees are on St. Simons Island, about 4 miles away, and the St. Simons Lighthouse is visible on the right.

"The Marshes of Glynn" is a poem by American writer Sidney Lanier. It appears in Lanier's Hymns of the Marshes, an unfinished set of lyrical nature poems that describe the open salt marshes of Glynn County in coastal Georgia. While some believe the poem was written while Lanier was visiting the area in 1875, there is speculation that the majority was written in Baltimore during 1878 as part of an entry for the anthology A Masque of Poets, a collection of works from various artists. Although A Masque of Poets received poor reviews from readers, "The Marshes of Glynn" was considered by critics to be one of the better entries in the book.

== See also ==
- Glynn County, Georgia for information about the setting of The Marshes of Glynn.
