= Sidney Lanier =

American musician and poet (1842–1881)

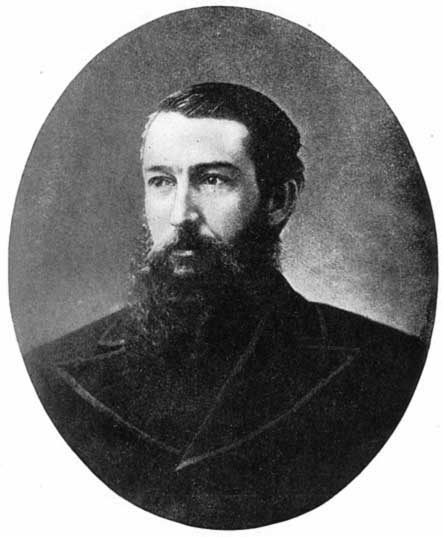
- Born: Sidney Clopton Lanier; February 3, 1842; Macon, Georgia, U.S.
- Died: September 7, 1881 (aged 39); Lynn, North Carolina, U.S.
- Resting place: Green Mount Cemetery, Baltimore, Maryland
- Occupations: Poet; musician; academic
- Spouse: Mary Day (m. 1867)
- Children: 3
- Parent: Robert S. Lanier (father)
- Writing career
- Period: 1867–1881
- Military career
- Allegiance: Confederate States
- Branch: Confederate Signal Corps
- Rank: Private
- Conflicts: American Civil War

Sidney Clopton Lanier (February 3, 1842 – September 7, 1881) was an American musician, poet and author. He served in the Confederate States Army as a private, worked on a blockade-running ship for which he was imprisoned (resulting in his catching tuberculosis), taught, worked at a hotel where he gave musical performances, was a church organist, and worked as a lawyer. As a poet he sometimes used dialects. Many of his poems are written in heightened, but often archaic, American English. He became a flautist and sold poems to publications. He eventually became a professor of literature at Johns Hopkins University in Baltimore, and is known for his adaptation of musical meter to poetry. Many schools, other structures and two lakes are named for him, and he became hailed in the South as the "poet of the Confederacy". A 1972 US postage stamp honored him as an "American poet".

== Early life and military career ==
Sidney Clopton Lanier was born February 3, 1842, in Macon, Georgia, to parents Robert Sampson Lanier and Mary Jane Anderson. On his father's side he was descended of French Huguenots. His middle name, "Clopton", was in honor of David Clopton, a former classmate of his father's. He began playing the flute at an early age, and his love of that musical instrument continued throughout his life. He attended Oglethorpe University, which at the time was near Milledgeville, Georgia, and he was a member of the Sigma Alpha Epsilon fraternity. He graduated first in his class shortly before the outbreak of the American Civil War. He returned to Oglethorpe the next year, as a tutor, and befriended Milton Harlow Northrup, a New York native, who was a conductor at the school.

During the war, he served in the Confederate Signal Corps, primarily in the tidewater region of Virginia. Later, he and his brother Clifford served as pilots aboard English blockade runners, and Lanier's ship, the Lucy, was captured by the USS Santiago de Cuba, on November 3, 1864. He was incarcerated in a military prison at Point Lookout in Maryland, where he contracted tuberculosis (generally known as "consumption" at the time). He suffered greatly from this disease, then incurable and usually fatal, for the rest of his life.

== Career ==
Shortly after the war, he taught school briefly, then moved to Montgomery, Alabama, where he worked as a night clerk at the Exchange Hotel (a hotel partly owned by his grandfather; his brother Clifford also worked there and became a part owner after the war), and also performed as a musician. He was the regular organist at the First Presbyterian Church in nearby Prattville. He wrote his only novel, Tiger Lilies (1867), while in Alabama.

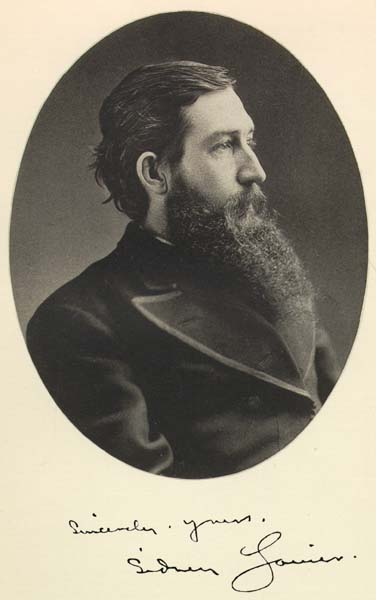
Sidney Lanier

This novel was partly autobiographical, describing a stay in 1860 at his grandfather's Montvale Springs resort hotel near Knoxville, Tennessee. In 1867, he moved to Prattville, at that time a small town just north of Montgomery, where he taught at a small school. He married Mary Day of Macon in 1867 and moved back to his hometown, where he began working in his father's law office.

After passing the Georgia bar, Lanier practiced as a lawyer for several years. During this period he wrote a number of lesser poems, using the "cracker" and "negro" dialects of his day, about poor white and black farmers in the Reconstruction South. He traveled extensively through southern and eastern portions of the United States in search of a cure for his tuberculosis.

While on one such journey in Texas, he rediscovered his native and untutored talent for the flute and decided to travel to the northeast in hopes of finding employment as a musician in an orchestra. Unable to find work in New York City, Philadelphia, or Boston, he signed on to play flute for the Peabody Orchestra in Baltimore, Maryland, shortly after its organization. He taught himself musical notation and quickly rose to the position of first flautist. He was famous in his day for his performances of a personal composition for the flute called "Black Birds", which mimics the song of that species.

In an effort to support Mary and their three sons, he also wrote poetry for magazines. His most famous poems were "Corn" (1875), "The Symphony" (1875), "Centennial Meditation" (1876), "The Song of the Chattahoochee" (1877), "The Marshes of Glynn", (1878) "A Sunrise Song" (1881), and "Evening Song" (1884). These poems are generally considered his greatest works, and have been set to music by many composers, including Charles Tomlinson Griffes and Grace W. Root. "The Marshes of Glynn" and "A Sunrise Song" are part of an unfinished set of lyrical nature poems known as the "Hymns of the Marshes", which describe the vast, open salt marshes of Glynn County on the coast of Georgia. (The longest bridge in Georgia is in Glynn County and is named for Lanier.)

== Later life and death ==
Later in his short 39-year life, he became a student, lecturer, and, finally, a faculty member at the Johns Hopkins University in Baltimore, specializing in the works of the English novelists, Shakespeare, the Elizabethan sonneteers, Chaucer, and the Old English poets. He published a book entitled The Science of English Verse (1880) in which he developed a novel theory exploring the connections between musical notation and meter in poetry. In 1883, a posthumous collection of lectures, entitled The English Novel and Its Principle of Development was published.

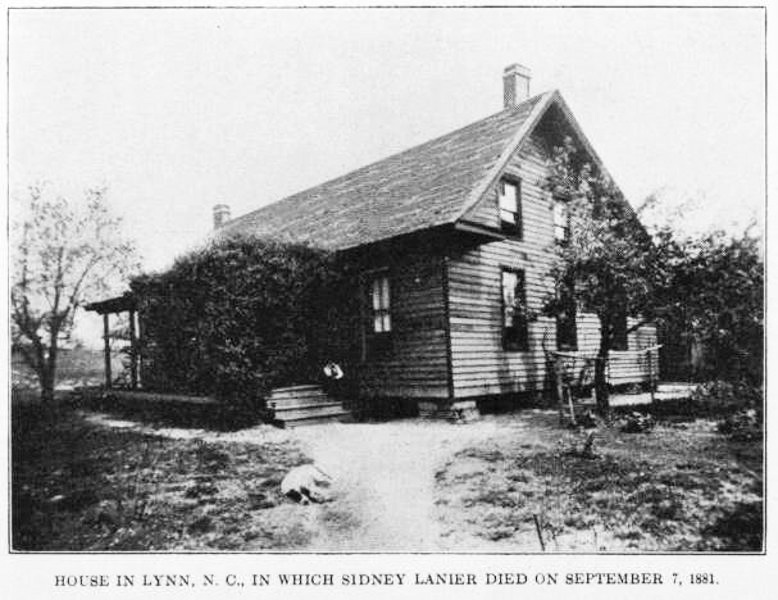
The house in which Lanier died.

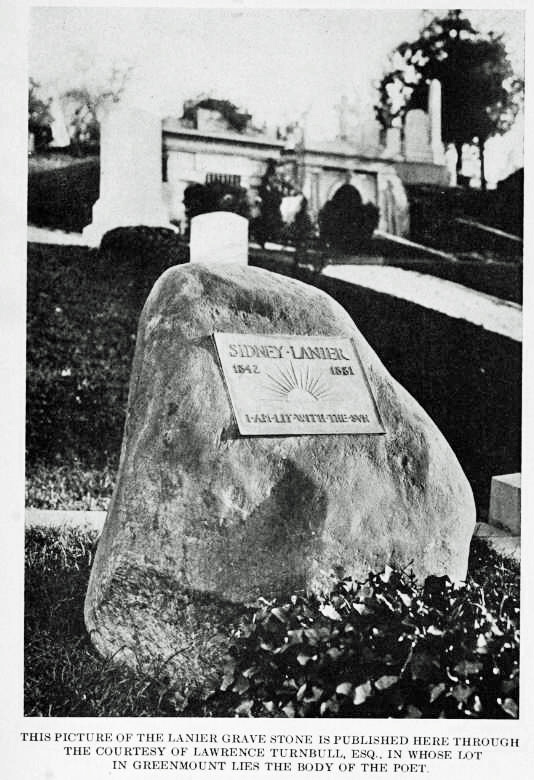
Memorial stone for Lanier.

Lanier finally succumbed to complications caused by his tuberculosis on September 7, 1881, while convalescing with his family near Lynn, North Carolina. He was 39. He is buried in Green Mount Cemetery in Baltimore.

== Writing style and literary theory ==
A poet who connected musical notation with poetic meter, he was described by C.K. Williams as "a deft metrical technician". He developed a unique style of poetry written in logaoedic dactyls, which was heavily influenced by the works of Anglo-Saxon poets. He wrote several of his greatest poems in this meter, including "Revenge of Hamish" (1878), "The Marshes of Glynn" and "Sunrise". In Lanier's hands, the logaoedic dactylic meter led to a free-form, almost prose-like style of poetry that was greatly admired by Henry Wadsworth Longfellow, Bayard Taylor, Charlotte Cushman, and other poets and critics of the day. The "sprung verse" metrical system developed by Gerard Manley Hopkins at about the same time superficially resembles Lanier's practice but shows no influence (and there is no evidence that they knew each other or that either had read any of the other's works).

Lanier also published essays on literary and musical topics. He edited a notable series of four abridgements, published by Charles Scribner's Sons, of literary works about knightly combat and chivalry in modernized language more appealing to the boys of his day:

- The Boy's Froissart (1879), a retelling of Jean Froissart's Froissart's Chronicles, which tell of adventure, battle and custom in medieval "England, France, Spain, etc."
- The Boy's King Arthur (1880), based on Sir Thomas Malory's compilation of the legends of King Arthur and the Knights of the Round Table.
- The Boy's Mabinogion (1881), based on the early Welsh legends of King Arthur, as retold in the Red Book of Hergest.
- The Boy's Percy (published posthumously in 1882), consisting of old ballads of war, adventure and love based on Bishop Thomas Percy's Reliques of Ancient English Poetry.

He also wrote two travelogues that were widely read at the time, entitled Florida: Its Scenery, Climate and History (1875) and Sketches of India (1876).

== Legacy and honors ==
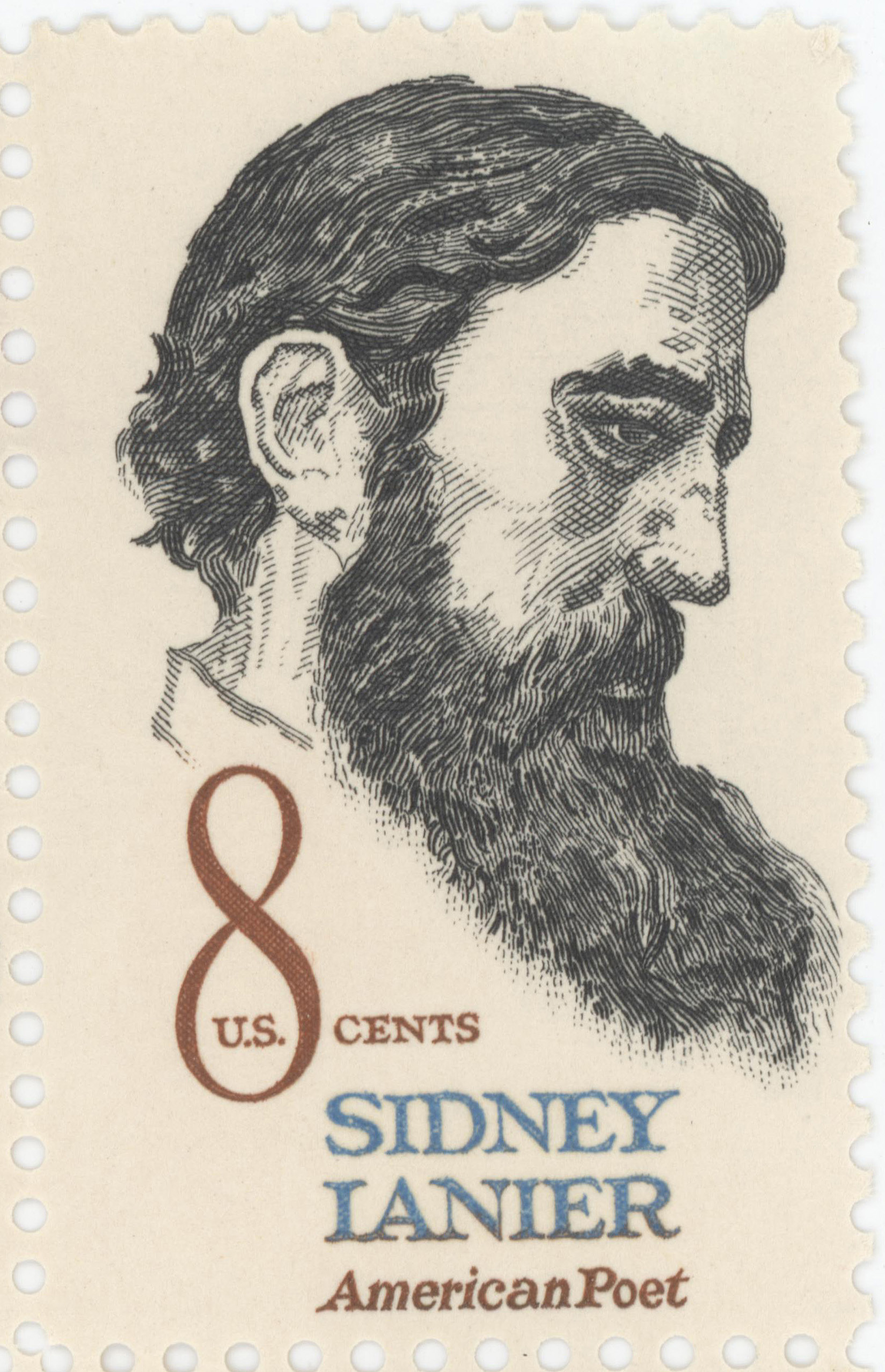
1972 U.S. postage stamp, Sidney Lanier – American Poet

The Sidney Lanier Cottage in Macon, Georgia, is listed on the National Register of Historic Places. The square stone Four Southern Poets Monument, located between 7th and 8th Streets in Augusta, lists Lanier as one of Georgia's four great poets, all of whom were in the Confederate military. The southeastern side bears this inscription: "To Sidney Lanier 1842–1880. The Catholic man who hath mightily won God out of knowledge and good out of infinite pain and sight out of blindness and purity out of a stain." The other poets on the monument are James Ryder Randall, Fr. Abram Ryan, and Paul Hayne.

Baltimore honored Lanier with a large and elaborate bronze and granite sculptural monument, created by Hans K. Schuler and located on the campus of the Johns Hopkins University. In addition to the monument at Johns Hopkins, Lanier was also later memorialized on the campus of Duke University in Durham, North Carolina. Upon the construction of the iconic Duke Chapel between 1930 and 1935 on the university's West Campus, a statue of Lanier was included alongside two fellow prominent Southerners, Thomas Jefferson and Robert E. Lee. This statue, which appears to show a Lanier older than the 39 years he actually lived, is situated on the right side of the portico leading into the chapel narthex. It is prominently featured on the cover of the 2010 autobiographical memoir Hannah's Child, by Stanley Hauerwas, a Methodist theologian teaching at Duke Divinity School.

The United Daughters of the Confederacy worked successfully to enhance Lanier's legacy.

Lanier's poem "The Marshes of Glynn" is the inspiration for a cantata by the same name that was created by the modern English composer Andrew Downes to celebrate the Royal Opening of the Adrian Boult Hall in Birmingham, England, in 1986.

Piers Anthony used Lanier, his life, and his poetry in his science-fiction novel Macroscope (1969). He quotes from "The Marshes of Glynn" and other references appear throughout the novel.

In 1980, Yugoslav rock band Lutajuća Srca recorded the song "Večernja pesma", featuring lyrics from Lanier's "An Evening Poem" in Serbo-Croatian, the song becoming a minor hit for the band.

Several entities have been named for Sidney Lanier. Among them are:

=== Inhabited places ===
- Lanier County, Georgia
- Sidney Lanier Avenue, residential street, Athens, Georgia
- Sidney Lanier Lane, residential street, Greenwich, Connecticut
- Lanier Avenue, Fayetteville, Georgia
- Lanier Street, residential street, Decatur, Alabama
- Lanier Heights, neighborhood, Washington, D.C.
- Shelby, NC (one - two seasons for the healing mineral springs in Cleveland County, NC)
- (Indirectly) USS Lanier, which was named for the county.

=== Bodies of water ===
- Lake Lanier, operated by the U.S. Army Corps of Engineers northeast of Atlanta, Georgia
- Lake Lanier in Landrum, South Carolina.

=== Schools ===
- Sidney Lanier High School in Montgomery, Alabama (The Montgomery County Board of Education voted to close the school in 2024)
- Sidney Lanier School in Gainesville, Florida
- Lanier University, short-lived university; first Baptist, then owned by the Ku Klux Klan for a year, in Atlanta, Georgia
- The Sidney Lanier Building (previously Sidney Lanier Elementary School) on the campus of Glynn Academy, in Brunswick, Georgia
- Lanier Middle School in Sugar Hill, Georgia
- Lanier High School in Sugar Hill, Georgia
- Lanier Elementary School in Gainesville, Georgia
- Sidney Lanier Elementary School in Tulsa, Oklahoma
- Sidney Lanier High School in Austin, Texas. Renamed to Juan Navarro High School Feb, 2019
- Sidney Lanier Expressive Arts Vanguard Elementary School in Dallas, Texas
- Lanier Middle School in Houston, Texas (Now Bob Lanier Middle School after 90 years as Sidney Lanier Middle School)
- Lanier High School in San Antonio, Texas
- Sidney Lanier Elementary School in Tampa, Florida
- Lanier Technical College in Gainesville, Georgia
- Katherine Johnson Middle School in Fairfax, Virginia was named Sidney Lanier Middle School for 60 years before being renamed for Johnson in 2021.
- Lanier Elementary school in Blount County, Tennessee

=== Other ===
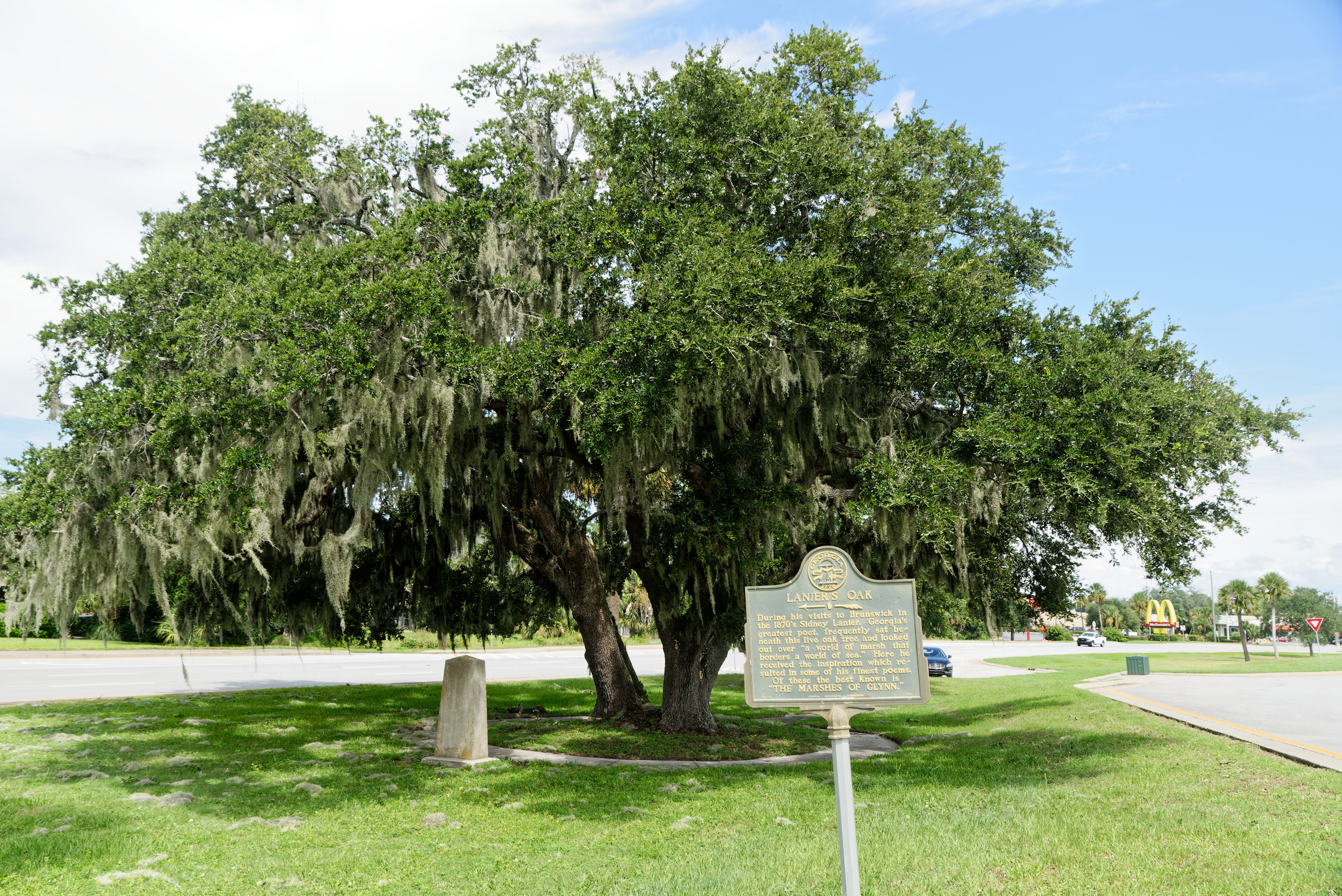
Sidney Lanier sat under this oak tree and was inspired to write the poem "The Marshes of Glynn".

- Sidney Lanier Cottage, the birthplace of Lanier, in Macon, Georgia
- Sidney Lanier Bridge over the South Brunswick River in Brunswick, Georgia
- Sidney Lanier Monument, a monument in Piedmont Park in Atlanta
- Lanier's Oak in Brunswick, Georgia
- The Lanier Library, Tryon, North Carolina. Lanier's widow, Mary, donated two of his volumes of poetry to begin the collection when the library was established in 1890.
- Sidney Lanier Camp, Eliot, Maine.
- Sidney Lanier Boulevard in Duluth, GA
- The Sidney Lanier Suite at The Harwood Cottage at Historic Macon, GA
- The World War II Liberty Ship SS Sidney Lanier was named in his honor.
- A 1972 US eight-cent postage stamp: "Sidney Lanier - American poet"
- Sidney Lanier Memorial Scholarship at the University of California, Los Angeles
- Lanier Island, in the Mackay River in Glynn County, Georgia.

== Citations and further reading ==
- De Bellis, Jack. Sidney Lanier, Poet of the Marshes, in Southern Literature Series. Atlanta, Ga.: Georgia Humanities Council, 1988. ISBN 0-8203-1319-X (assigned to the University of Georgia Press).
- Fish, Tallu. Sidney Lanier, America's Sweet Singer of Songs. Cynthiana, Ky.: Privately Printed ... [for distribution by] Betty Fish Smith, 1988. Without ISBN
- Fishburne, Charles C., junior. Sidney Lanier, Poet of the Marshes, Visits Cedar Keys [in] 1875. Cedar Key, Flor.: Sea Hawk Publications, 1986. Without ISBN
- Gabin, Jane S. A Living Minstrelsy: The Poetry and Music of Sidney Lanier. Macon, GA: Mercer University Press, 1985. ISBN 0-86554-155-8
- Lamar, May. Brother Sid. Montgomery, AL.: The Donnell Group, 2012. ISBN 0988416506.
- Starke, Aubrey Harrison. Sidney Lanier: A Biographical and Critical Study. Chapel Hill, NC: The University of North Carolina Press, 1933.
