= South Atlantic (magazine) =

South Atlantic was an American magazine published from 1877 to 1882. It was edited by Carrie Jenkins Harris (sometimes listed as "Mrs. Cicero Harris", her husband's name). It started in Wilmington, North Carolina, and then moved to Baltimore.

For the first issue, Harris, solicited Paul Hamilton Hayne to supply a poem for free, saying in a letter dated 1877-08-03 that she regretted having limited funding and: "I am sure you desire the successful establishment of such an enterprise sufficiently to induce you to give me a few pages of ms in order to ensure that success.".
