= Powelton, Georgia =

Unincorporated community in Georgia, U.S.

Coordinates: 33.4287°N 82.8707°W

Powelton is an unincorporated community in Hancock County, in the U.S. state of Georgia.

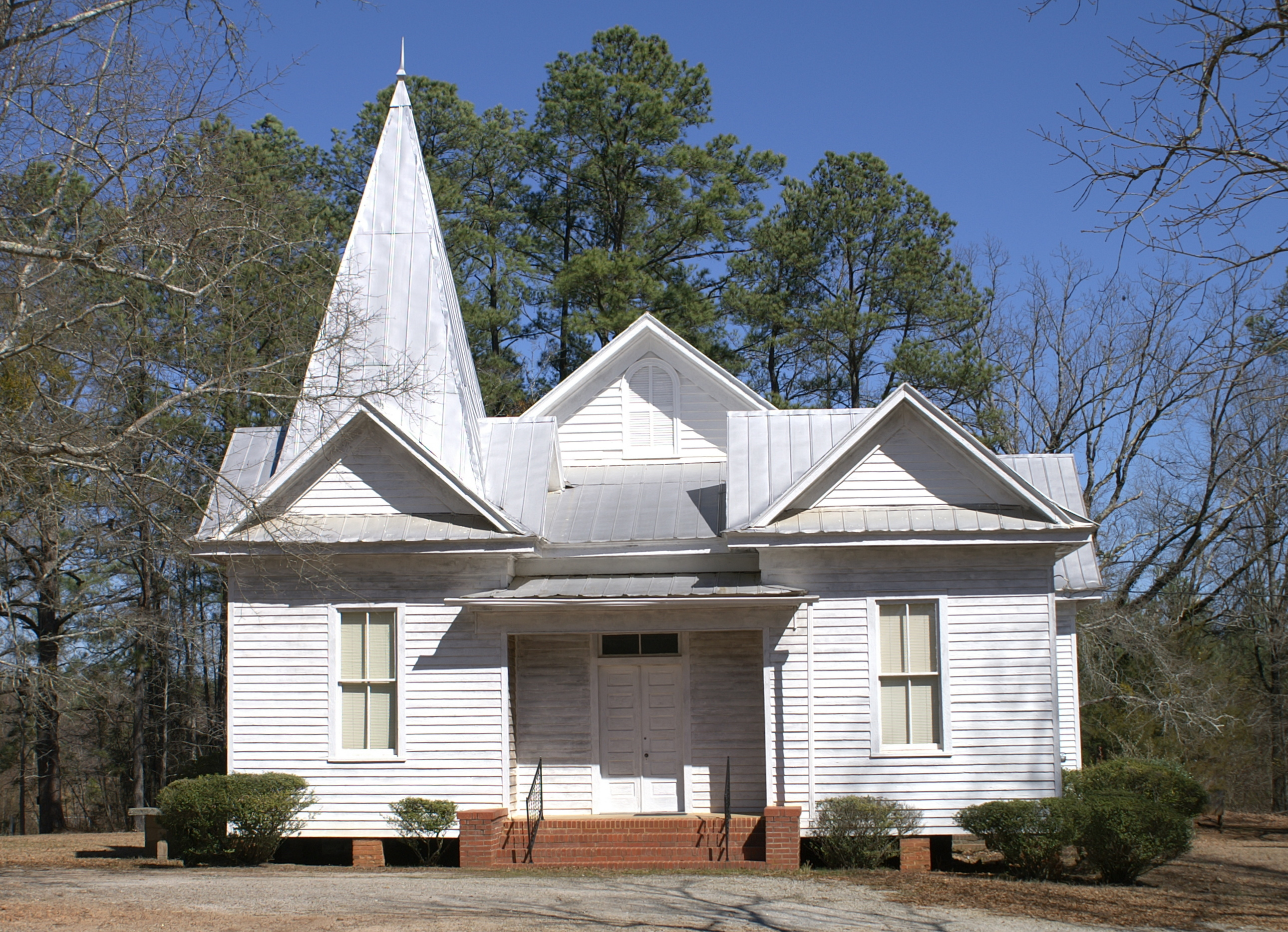
Powelton Baptist Church, in 2007

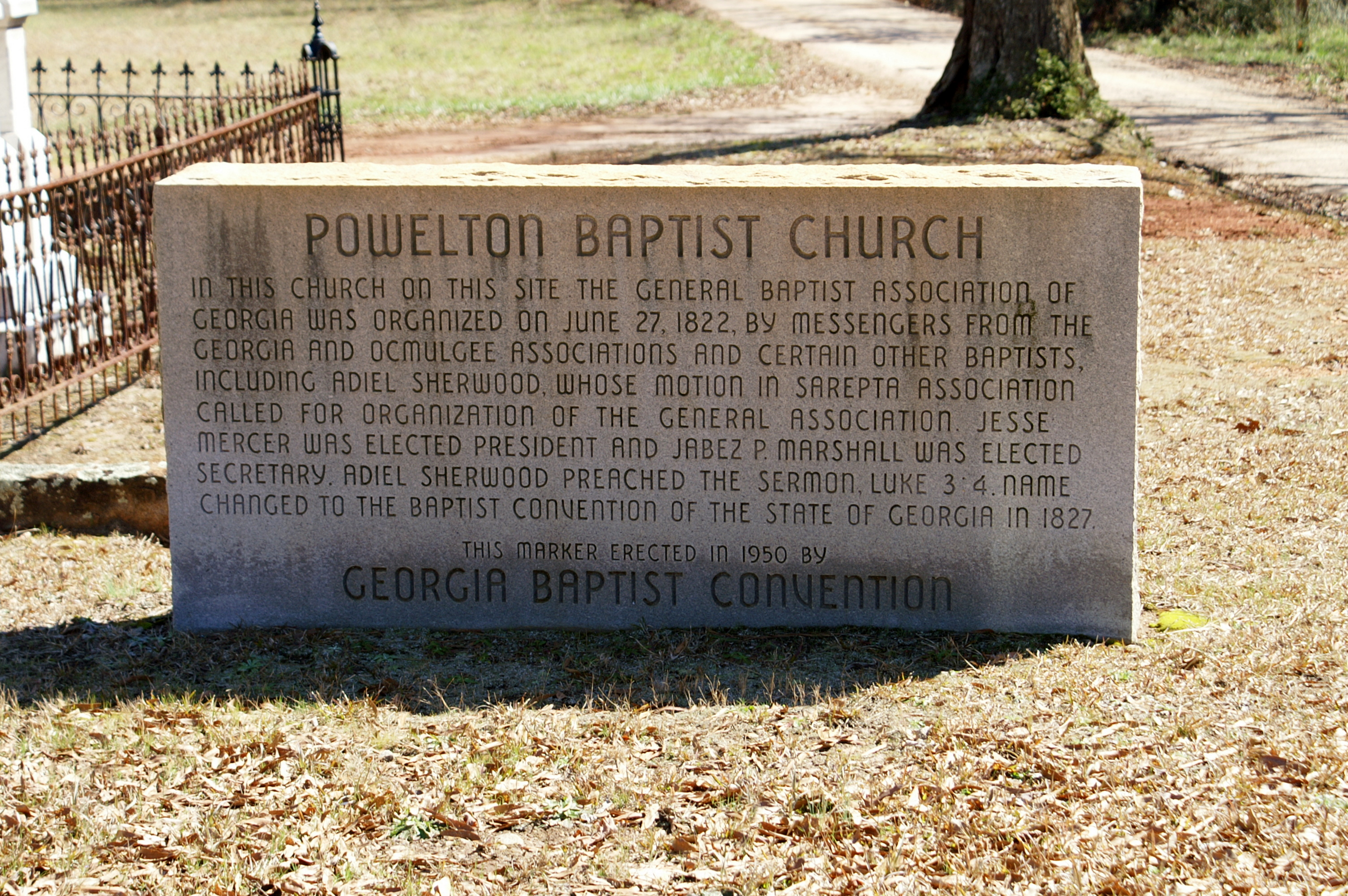
About Baptist association

== History ==
The Georgia General Assembly incorporated Powelton in 1816; the town's municipal charter was repealed in 1901. A post office was in operation at Powelton from 1804 until 1913.

Powelton was the location, in 1822, of a meeting of Baptists that led to the formation of the Georgia Baptist Convention.
