= Dorothea Brande =

American writer and editor

- Brande from a 1937 magazine
- Born: Alice Dorothea Alden Thompson; January 12, 1892; Chicago, US
- Died: December 17, 1948 (aged 56); Boston, US
- Education: University of Chicago; Lewis Institute; University of Michigan
- Occupation: Writer
- Notable work: Becoming a Writer
- Spouses: Herbert Brande; Seward Collins

Dorothea Brande (12 January 1892 – 12 December 1948) was an American writer and editor in New York City. She wrote Becoming a Writer in 1934, which remains in print today.

== Biography ==
Alice Dorothea Alden Thompson was born in Chicago on 12 January 1892. She attended the University of Chicago, the Lewis Institute and the University of Michigan. She married fellow Chicago newspaper reporter Herbert Brande in 1916. They divorced sometime before 1930.

Her book Becoming a Writer (pub. 1934) offers advice for beginning and sustaining any writing enterprise and remains in print today. Wake Up and Live (pub. 1936) which sold more than a million copies. was used as the inspiration for the comedy film Wake Up and Live in 1937.

While she was serving as associate editor of The American Review she married the journal's owner and editor, Seward Collins in 1936. Collins also served as the managing editor of The Bookman. Collins was a prominent literary figure in New York and a proponent of an American version of fascism.

Brande died in Boston on 17 December 1948.

== Selected works ==
=== Books ===
- Brande, Dorothea (1934). Becoming a Writer. San Diego, USA: Harcourt, Brace and Company.
- Brande, Dorothea (1935). Beauty Vanishes. London, UK: G Bell.
- Brande, Dorothea (1935). The Most Beautiful Lady. New York, USA: Farrar.
- Brande, Dorothea (1936). Wake Up and Live!. New York, USA: Simon and Schuster.
- Brande, Dorothea (1937). Letters to Philippa. Sheed and Ward, USA: Simon and Schuster.
- Brande, Dorothea (1938). My Invincible Aunt. Farrar & Rinehart, USA: Simon and Schuster.

=== Short stories ===
- "Eater of Souls". The Smart Set. 48 (1): 283-287. January 1916. (Published under the name 'Dorothea Thompson')
- "Values and Vivian". Smith's Magazine. 33 (1): 29-40. May 1921. (A Love story)
- "Prince Too Charming". Smith's Magazine. 34 (3): 419-430. January 1922.
