= Marion Elza Dodd =

American bookseller and author

Marion Elza Dodd (1883–1961) was an American bookseller, author, librarian, and professor. Dodd co-founded the National Association of College Bookstores in 1923.

== Early life and education ==
Marion Elza Dodd was born in 1883 in Glen Ridge, New Jersey, to Charles T. and Rebecca Northall Dodd. Her grandfather was Moses Dodd, was the founder of Dodd, Mead & Co., and many uncles and cousins were also book collectors, editors, and publishers.

Dodd received a B.A. from Smith College in 1906 and attended the School of Library Service at Columbia University from 1908 to 1909. She received an honorable M.A. from Smith College in 1936.

== Career ==
=== Hampshire Bookshop ===
Dodd co-founded the Hampshire Bookshop in Northampton, Massachusetts, with Mary Byers Smith (also an alumna of Smith) on April 7, 1916. The pair met through clubs at Smith College. Dodd received an inheritance from a wealthy aunt, then Dodd and Smith went to work, forming a corporation, enlisting officers and directors, and securing credit. They raised $25,000 through the sale of stock. Dodd and Smith launched the store with a slogan taken from an Emily Dickinson poem, "There Is No Frigate Like a Book." The store opened to customers in October of that year. The store was decorated in a nautical theme, and featured some furniture built by Dodd. In its first year, the bookstore did $29,000 worth of business.

The Hampshire Bookshop served the Northampton community and Smith College as bookstore and publisher and issued over 40 titles, local natural histories, keepsakes and pamphlets. In addition, it brought to Northampton over 100 writers of national and international repute during its operations including Dorothy Canfield Fisher, Robert Frost, Edna St. Vincent Millay, Christopher Morley, Vita Sackville-West, Carl Sandburg, Hugh Walpole and William Butler Yeats.

Dodd and Smith established a cooperative arrangement for Smith College students, the first arrangement of its kind at a women's college.

The shop published an occasional newsletter called Book Scorpion. There were 23 issues between 1921 and 1947.

Dodd retired with honors as president and manager of Hampshire Bookshop in 1951, but served as Chairman of the Board there from 1951-1957.

The Hampshire Bookshop closed in 1971.

=== Organizational work ===
Dodd co-founded the National Association of College Bookstores in 1923 and became the first woman to receive an honorable fellowship of the American Booksellers Association in 1925. Dodd was a member of the Executive Board of American Booksellers Association for 25 years, where she was the first woman officer. She served as secretary, and was the third Vice President.

=== Teaching ===
Dodd taught a course in bookselling at Columbia University Library School during the summers of 1930-1931, and for four years taught a course for Smith College at the Hampshire Bookshop on the History and Art of the Book.

=== Librarianship ===
Dodd worked as a librarian to John D. Rockefeller's General Education Board.

=== Writing ===
While living in Northampton, Massachusetts, with Esther Dunn, Dodd published under the Hampshire Bookshop, and wrote prefaces, book reviews, and articles for publications such as Yankee Magazine, Publishers Weekly, and Atlantic Monthly. Dodd wrote a series of articles about Northampton local authors called "The Book Lover's Trail of New England."

== Death ==
Dodd died on March 16, 1961, in Northampton at the age of 78.
