= Charles T. H. Goode House =

Historic house in Utah, United States

- U.S. National Register of Historic Places
- Location within Utah Location within the United States
- Location: 1215 E. Main St., American Fork, Utah
- Coordinates: 40°22′33″N 111°46′5″W
- Area: 0.4 acres (0.16 ha)
- Built: 1897
- MPS: Pleasant Grove Soft-Rock Buildings TR
- NRHP reference No.: 87000826
- Added to NRHP: June 9, 1987

The Charles T. H. Goode House at 1215 E. Main St. in American Fork, Utah was built in 1897 as a residential home. It was listed on the National Register of Historic Places in 1987. It is noted for its usage of soft-rock as its primary building material. It has since been demolished.

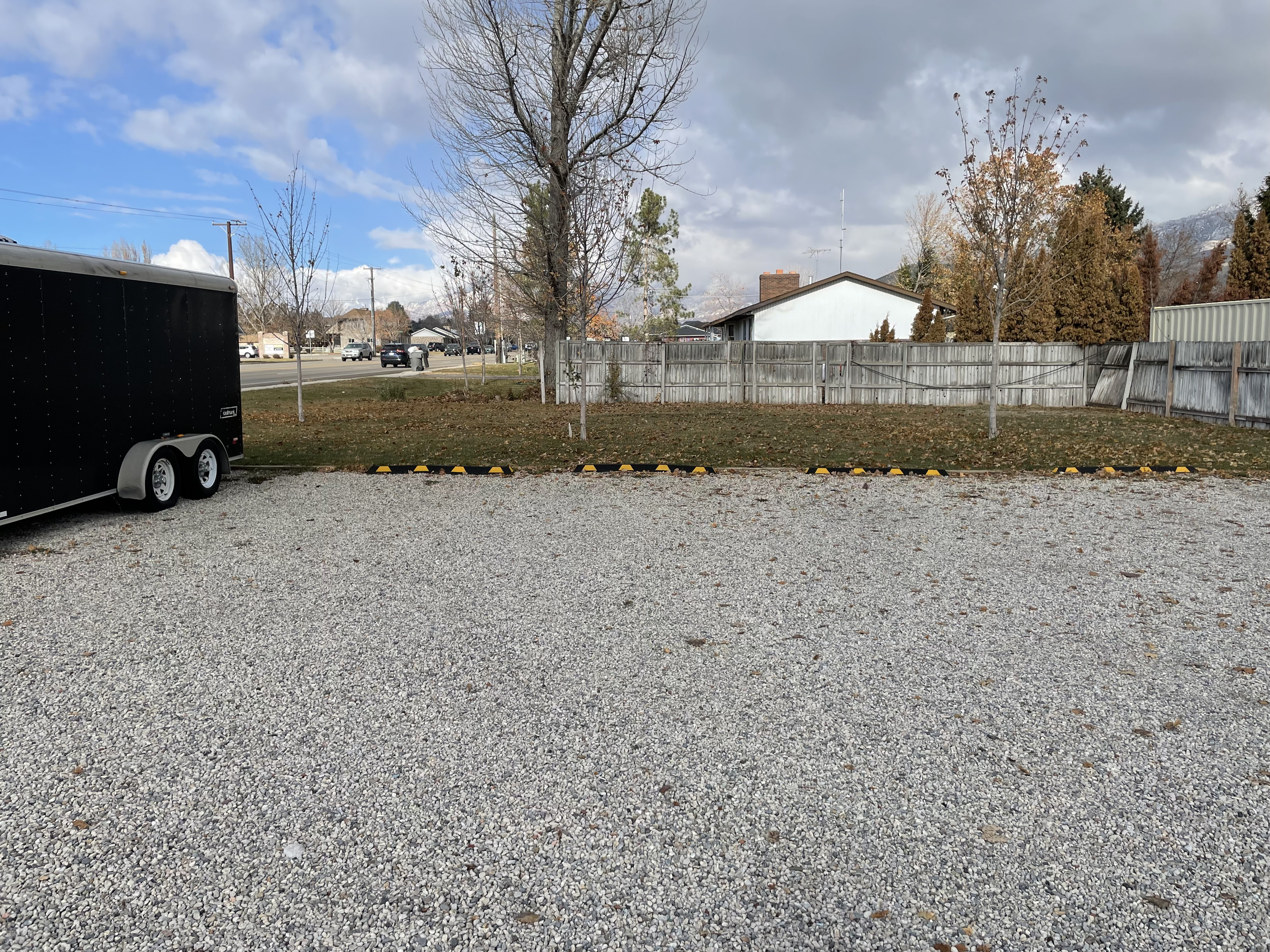
The former site of the Charles T.H. Goode House.

Charles T.H. Goodehouse was the home of Charles T. H. Goode, born 1847 in Wappenbury in Warwickshire, England before moving to the United States at the age of 21 after his conversion to mormonism. It remained relatively unchanged from its original 1897 state until 1940 before the interior was slightly altered and a porch was added.
