= Distributism =

Economic theory promoting local control

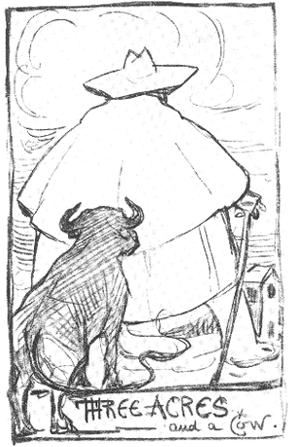
Self-portrait of G. K. Chesterton based on the distributist slogan "Three acres and a cow"

Distributism is an economic theory asserting that the world's productive assets should be widely owned rather than concentrated. Developed in the late 19th and early 20th centuries, distributism was based upon Catholic social teaching principles, especially those of Pope Leo XIII in his encyclical Rerum novarum (1891) and Pope Pius XI in Quadragesimo anno (1931). It has influenced Anglo Christian Democratic movements, and has been recognized as one of many influences on the social market economy.

Distributism views laissez-faire capitalism and state socialism as equally flawed and exploitative, due to their extreme concentration of ownership. Instead, it favours small independent craftsmen and producers; or, if that is not possible, economic mechanisms such as cooperatives and member-owned mutual organisations, as well as small to medium enterprises and vigorous anti-trust laws to restrain or eliminate overweening economic power. Christian democratic political parties such as the American Solidarity Party have advocated distributism alongside social market economy in their economic policies and party platform.

== Overview ==
According to distributists, the right to property is a fundamental right, and the means of production should be spread as widely as possible rather than being centralised under the control of the state (statocracy), a few individuals (plutocracy), or corporations (corporatocracy). Therefore, distributism advocates a society marked by widespread property ownership. Cooperative economist Race Mathews argues that such a system is key to creating a just social order.

Distributism has often been described in opposition to both laissez-faire capitalism and state socialism which distributists see as equally flawed and exploitative. Furthermore, some distributists argue that state capitalism and state socialism are the logical conclusion of capitalism as capitalism's concentrated powers eventually capture the state. Thomas Storck argues: "Both socialism and capitalism are products of the European Enlightenment and are thus modernising and anti-traditional forces. In contrast, distributism seeks to subordinate economic activity to human life as a whole, to our spiritual life, our intellectual life, our family life." A few distributists, including Dorothy Day, were influenced by the economic ideas of Pierre-Joseph Proudhon and his mutualist economic theory. The lesser-known anarchist branch of distributism of Day and the Catholic Worker Movement can be considered a form of free-market libertarian socialism due to their opposition to state capitalism and state socialism.

Some have seen it more as an aspiration, successfully realised in the short term by the commitment to the principles of subsidiarity and solidarity (built into financially independent local cooperatives and small family businesses). However, proponents also cite such periods as the Middle Ages as examples of the long-term historical viability of distributism. Particularly influential in the development of distributist theory were Catholic authors G. K. Chesterton and Hilaire Belloc, two of distributism's earliest and strongest proponents.

== Background ==
The mid-to-late 19th century witnessed an increase in the popularity of political Catholicism across Europe. According to historian Michael A. Riff, a common feature of these movements was opposition to secularism, capitalism, and socialism. In 1891 Pope Leo XIII promulgated Rerum novarum, in which he addressed the "misery and wretchedness pressing so unjustly on the majority of the working class" and spoke of how "a small number of very rich men" had been able to "lay upon the teeming masses of the laboring poor a yoke little better than that of slavery itself". Affirmed in the encyclical was the right of all men to own property, the necessity of a system that allowed "as many as possible of the people to become owners", the duty of employers to provide safe working conditions and sufficient wages, and the right of workers to unionise. Common and government property ownership was expressly dismissed as a means of helping the poor.

Around the start of the 20th century, G. K. Chesterton and Hilaire Belloc drew together the disparate experiences of the various cooperatives and friendly societies in Northern England, Ireland, and Northern Europe into a coherent political theory which specifically advocated widespread private ownership of housing and control of industry through owner-operated small businesses and worker-controlled cooperatives. In the United States in the 1930s, distributism was treated in numerous essays by Chesterton, Belloc and others in The American Review, published and edited by Seward Collins. Pivotal among Belloc's and Chesterton's other works regarding distributism are The Servile State and Outline of Sanity.

== Economic theory ==
=== Private property ===
In Rerum novarum, Leo XIII states that people are likely to work harder and with greater commitment if they possess the land on which they labour, which in turn will benefit them and their families as workers will be able to provide for themselves and their household. He puts forward the idea that when men have the opportunity to possess property and work on it, they will "learn to love the very soil which yields in response to the labor of their hands, not only food to eat, but an abundance of the good things for themselves and those that are dear to them". He also states that owning property is beneficial for a person and his family and is, in fact, a right due to God having "given the earth for the use and enjoyment of the whole human race".

G. K. Chesterton presents similar views in his 1910 book, What's Wrong with the World. Chesterton believes that whilst God has limitless capabilities, man has limited abilities in terms of creation. Therefore, man is entitled to own property and treat it as he sees fit, stating: "Property is merely the art of the democracy. It means that every man should have something that he can shape in his own image, as he is shaped in the image of heaven. But because he is not God, but only a graven image of God, his self-expression must deal with limits; properly with limits that are strict and even small."

According to Belloc, the distributive state (the state which has implemented distributism) contains "an agglomeration of families of varying wealth, but by far the greater number of owners of the means of production". This broader distribution does not extend to all property but only to productive property; that is, that property which produces wealth, namely, the things needed for man to survive. It includes land, tools, and so on. Distributism allows society to have public goods such as parks and transit systems. Distributists accept that wage labour will remain a small part of the economy, businesses employees, usually young, inexperienced people.

=== Redistribution of wealth and productive assets ===
Distributism requires either direct or indirect distribution of the means of production (productive assets)—in some ideological circles including the redistribution of wealth—to a wide portion of society instead of concentrating it in the hands of a minority of wealthy elites (as seen in its criticism of certain varieties of capitalism) or the hands of the state (as seen in its criticism of certain varieties of communism and socialism). More capitalist-oriented supporters support distributism-influenced social capitalism (also known as a social market economy), while more socialist-oriented supporters support distributism-influenced libertarian socialism. Examples of methods of distributism include direct productive property redistribution, taxation of excessive property ownership, and small-business subsidization.

=== Guild system ===
Distributists advocate in favour of the return of a guild system to help regulate industries to promote moral standards of professional conduct and economic equality among members of a guild. Such moral standards of professional conduct would typically focus on business conduct, working conditions and other issues in relation to industry specific matters such as workplace training standards.

=== Banks ===
Distributism favours cooperative and mutual banking institutions such as credit unions, building societies and mutual banks. This is considered to be the preferred alternative to private banks.

== Social theory ==
=== Human family ===
G. K. Chesterton considered one's home and family the centrepiece of society. He recognized the family unit and home as centrepieces of living and believed that every man should have his property and home to enable him to raise and support his family. Distributists recognize that strengthening and protecting the family requires that society be nurturing.

=== Subsidiarity ===
Distributism puts great emphasis on the principle of subsidiarity. This principle holds that no larger unit (whether social, economic, or political) should perform a function that a smaller unit can perform. In Quadragesimo anno, Pope Pius XI provided the classical statement of the principle: "Just as it is gravely wrong to take from individuals what they can accomplish by their own initiative and industry and give it to the community, so also it is an injustice and at the same time a grave evil and disturbance of right order to assign to a greater and higher association what lesser and subordinate organizations can do".

=== Social security ===
The Democratic Labour Party of Australia espouses distributism and does not hold the view of favouring the elimination of social security who, for instance, wish to "[r]aise the level of student income support payments to the Henderson poverty line".

The American Solidarity Party has a platform of favouring an adequate social security system, stating: "We advocate for social safety nets that adequately provide for the material needs of the most vulnerable in society".

== Politics ==
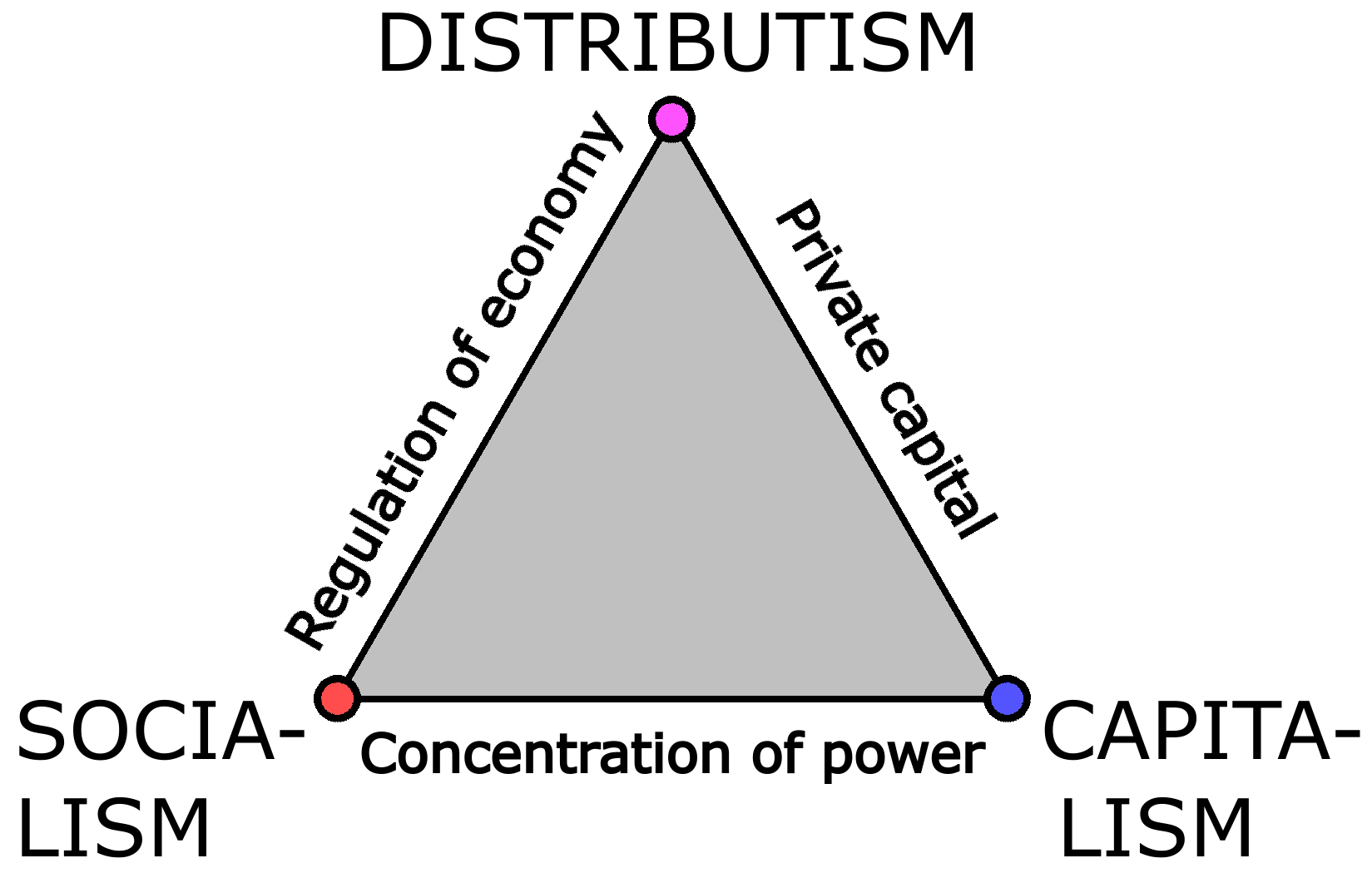
Distributism's relation to socialism and capitalism

The position of distributists, when compared to other political philosophies, is somewhat paradoxical and complicated (see triangulation). Firmly entrenched in an organic but very English Catholicism, advocating culturally traditional and agrarian values, directly challenging the precepts of Whig history—Belloc was nonetheless an MP for the Liberal Party, and Chesterton once stated, "As much as I ever did, more than I ever did, I believe in Liberalism. But there was a rosy time of innocence when I believed in Liberals".

Distributism does not favour one political order over another (political accidentalism). While some distributists such as Dorothy Day have been anarchists, most Chestertonian distributists are opposed to the mere concept of anarchism. Chesterton thought that distributism would benefit from the discipline that theoretical analysis imposes and that distributism is best seen as a widely encompassing concept that any number of interpretations and perspectives can fit inside of. This concept is expected to fit a political system broadly characterized by widespread ownership of productive property.

In the United States, the American Solidarity Party generally adheres to Distributist principles as its economic model. Ross Douthat and Reihan Salam view their Grand New Party, a roadmap for revising the Republican Party in the United States, as "a book written in the distributist tradition".

The Brazilian political party, Humanist Party of Solidarity, was a distributist party, alongside the National Distributist Party in England, and the Democratic Labour Party in Australia.

In the first round of the 2024 Romanian presidential election, candidate Călin Georgescu, an independent candidate who advocates for a system based on distributism and sovereigntism received 23% of votes and qualified for the second round.

== Influence ==
=== E. F. Schumacher ===
Distributism is known to have influenced the economist E. F. Schumacher, a convert to Catholicism.

=== Mondragon Corporation ===
The Mondragon Corporation, based in the Basque Country in a region of Spain and France, was founded by a Catholic priest, Father José María Arizmendiarrieta, who seems to have been influenced by the same Catholic social and economic teachings that inspired Belloc, Chesterton, Father Vincent McNabb, and the other founders of distributism.

=== Guild of St Joseph and St Dominic ===
Distributist ideas were put into practice by The Guild of St Joseph and St Dominic, a group of artists and craftsmen who established a community in Ditchling, Sussex, England, in 1920, with the motto "Men rich in virtue studying beautifulness living in peace in their houses". The guild sought to recreate an idealised medieval lifestyle in the manner of the Arts and Crafts Movement. It survived for almost 70 years until 1989.

== List of distributist parties ==
=== Current ===
- Australia – Democratic Labour Party
- Romania – Pirate Party Romania
- United States – American Solidarity Party
- United Kingdom - National distributist party
- Mexico – Nationalist Front of Mexico

=== Historical ===
- United Kingdom – Distributist League (1926–1940), Third Way (1990–2006)
- Brazil – Humanist Party of Solidarity (1995–2019)

== Notable distributists ==
=== Historical ===
- Herbert Agar
- Hilaire Belloc
- L. Brent Bozell Jr.
- Charles Coughlin
- Cecil Chesterton
- G. K. Chesterton
- Seward Collins
- Gustavo Corção
- Dorothy Day
- Adam Doboszyński
- Horacio de la Costa
- J. P. de Fonseka
- J.R.R. Tolkien
- Eric Gill
- Douglas Hyde
- Saunders Lewis
- Peter Maurin
- Vincent McNabb
- Arthur Penty
- Hilary Pepler
- Óscar Romero
- Dorothy L. Sayers
- William Purcell Witcutt

=== Contemporary ===
- Dale Ahlquist
- Albert Bikaj
- Phillip Blond
- Allan C. Carlson
- David W. Cooney
- Charles A. Coulombe
- Sean Domencic
- Călin Georgescu
- Bill Kauffman
- Race Mathews
- John C. Médaille
- John Papworth
- Joseph Pearce
- Juan Manuel de Prada
- Douglas Rushkoff
- John Sharpe
- Richard Williamson

== Key texts ==
- Rerum novarum (1891), papal encyclical by Pope Leo XIII.
- Quadragesimo anno (1931), papal encyclical by Pope Pius XI.
- Centesimus Annus (1991), papal encyclical by Pope John Paul II.
- Evangelii gaudium (2013), apostolic exhortation by Pope Francis.
- What's Wrong with the World (1910) by G. K. Chesterton ISBN 0-89870-489-8 – eText.
- The Outline of Sanity (1927) by G. K. Chesterton.
- Utopia of Usurers (1917) by G. K. Chesterton.
- The Servile State (1912) by Hilaire Belloc.
- An Essay on The Restoration of Property (1936) by Hilaire Belloc ISBN 0-9714894-4-0.
- Jobs of Our Own (1999) by Race Mathews ISBN 978-1871204179.

== See also ==
Related concepts

- Agrarianism – Philosophy supporting rural society
- Bioregionalism – Philosophy advocating governance and culture based on ecological and geographic regions
- Catholic social teaching – Social doctrine of the Catholic Church
- Distributed economy – Concept in network theory
- Distributive justice – Concept relating to distribution of rewards to group members
- Localism (politics) – Political philosophy prioritizing local governance and community control
- Market socialism – Economic system based on social ownership of the means of production in a market economy
- Mutual aid (organization theory) – Voluntary exchange of resources and services for mutual benefit
- Predistribution – Fiscal policy idea
- Subsidiarity – Principle of social organization

Similar positions

- Anarcho-syndicalism – Anarchist organisational model for trade unions
- Jeffersonian democracy – American political persuasion of the 1790s until the 1820s
- Christian democracy – Christian socioeconomic model
- Gandhian economics – Economic system of Mahatma Gandhi
- Georgism – Economic philosophy centered on common ownership of land
- Guild socialism – Political labor movement
- Mutualism (economic theory) – Anarchist school of thought and socialist economic theory
- Non-conformists of the 1930s – Avantgarde movement during the inter-war period in France
- Ownership society – Slogan
- Property-owning democracy – Political economy system where state intervention allows fair possession distribution
- Social Credit – Distributive economic theory
- Traditionalist conservatism – Political ideology advocating traditional morals and social order
- Ujamaa – 1960s–1980s Tanzanian socialist ideology
