= The American Review (literary journal) =

US magazine (1933–1937)

- Editor: Seward Collins
- Categories: Literature, politics
- Frequency: Monthly (except July and August)
- First issue: April 1933
- Final issue: October 1937
- Country: United States
- Language: English
- OCLC: 1480672

The American Review was a magazine of politics and literature established by the fascist publisher Seward Collins in 1933. There were 71 issues published, containing articles, editorials, notes, and reviews, before the journal ceased operations in October 1937.

== Formation ==
Before he founded The American Review, Collins was editor of The Bookman, a New York-based literary magazine that had changed hands multiple times since its launch in 1895. Under his editorship, The Bookman increasingly reflected Collins's conservative and pro-Fascist political views. Upon establishing the Review in 1933, he ceased publication of The Bookman, which he regarded as the former's predecessor.

With the Review, Collins made his political aims more explicit, intending to counter the problems he saw in American politics and economics. To do so he brought together the writings and opinions of four loosely compatible traditionalist groups: the British Distributists, the Neo-scholastics, the New Humanists, and the Agrarians, with whom Collins would have the closest relationship.

The American Review is founded to give greater currency to the ideas of a number of groups and individuals who are radically critical of conditions prevalent in the modern world, but launch their criticism from a "traditionalist" basis: from the basis of a firm grasp on the immense body of experience accumulated by men in the past, and the insight which this knowledge affords. The magazine is a response to the widespread and growing feeling that the forces and principles which have produced the modern chaos are incapable of yielding any solution; that the only hope is a return to fundamentals and tested principles which have been largely pushed aside.

— Seward Collins, The American Review (April 1933)

To manage the composition and production of the journal Collins employed a small staff. For most of the run of the journal its editors were Geoffrey Stone, Marvin McCord Lowes, Dorothea Brande, and Collins, with the influence and assistance of political actors and literary figures like Allen Tate.

== Political advocacy ==
Collins commissioned the majority of The American Review's political content rather than relying on unsolicited submissions. As a result, the journal reflected his traditionalist polemics, for which he said he was "willing to incur the charge of being fanatical and extreme – to publish and write more extreme stuff than I actually whole-heartedly accept – in order to help define and clarify issues." His commissioning enabled the Review to maintain a consistency of voice that had not been possible at more liberal publications, and his attempt to synthesize multiple otherwise disparate conservative movements into an antimodernist coherent whole has attracted much scholarly interest.

The journal quickly became known for its publication of reactionary and even pro-fascist essays and editorials. Its debut issue included an article by Harold Goad in praise of the fascist political structure then in place in Italy and an editorial note from Collins advertising future coverage of "Fascist economics ... which have received scant treatment by our universally liberal and radical press." Still, the four political entities and Collins maintained a productive, if not always agreeable, relationship via the Review for most of the publication's relatively short life.

=== Controversy and decline ===
Collins himself was provocative in public as well as in print, expressing a number of unpopular opinions on politics and society. The extreme nature of some of his positions, or at least his presentation of them, drove collaborators away. An interview with FIGHT against War and Fascism's Grace Lumpkin was particularly damaging. Collins responded to one of the interviewer's questions by affirming: "Yes, I am a fascist. I admire Hitler and Mussolini very much" and went on to say he did not consider Hitler's treatment of Jews "persecution" because "The Jews make trouble" and "It is necessary to segregate them." Although he took exception to Lumpkin's use of his comments to paint the Agrarians as fascist in nature, he had already been accused of antisemitism and of supporting a version of fascism in America, and so stood by his statements.

The Agrarians immediately began to distance themselves from the Review and eventually broke ties with Collins. A number of other contributors, embarrassed by the incident, claimed ignorance or outrage that their work had been used in the service of a broader political mission which had at its core certain principles they did not agree with. The Agrarian and journalist Herbert Agar became one of Collins's most vehement detractors. In an interview with Marxist Quarterly he said it was "illogical" for anyone to be associated with The American Review and at the same time claim to oppose fascism, and furthermore that he "would not, now that its policies have become unmistakably clear, write a piece for The American Review if it were the last publication left in America – as it might become if America goes fascist!"

By the end of 1936 most of the important contributors to the journal had distanced themselves from it. It became more difficult for Collins to continue and in 1937, after he opened what he called "New York's only Right-wing bookshop", The American Review ceased publication.

== Notable contributors ==
The American Review featured the work of a range of socially conscious essayists, critics, poets, novelists, scholars, historians, and journalists. Although Collins viewed all of their work as complementary to his own ideology, most on this list are not otherwise known to have shared the same views on fascism or race, and many explicitly condemned the same.

- Herbert Agar – Agrarian who published "The Task for Conservatism" in the March 1934 issue
- William Edward David Allen – pro-fascist essayist and scholar
- Irving Babbitt – New Humanist writer
- Howard Baker – poet, dramatist, and critic
- Hilaire Belloc – English writer, historian and distributist who appeared in several issues
- Nikolai Berdyaev – Russian religious and political philosopher
- John Peale Bishop – poet and novelist
- Dorothea Brande – journalist and literary critic who worked with Collins, whom she would later marry, at The Bookman. She provided editorial assistance at the Review, especially in literary matters, drawing on her experience working at several magazines
- Cleanth Brooks – literary critic associated with the Southern Agrarians and the Fugitives, known for contributions to New Criticism
- G. K. Chesterton – English writer who wrote several essays on distributism for the Review
- Ralph Adams Cram – Monarchist writer
- Donald Davidson – poet, essayist, critic, and Southern Agrarian
- Christopher Dawson – independent scholar known for his work on cultural history and Christianity
- Mark Van Doren – Pulitzer Prize-winning poet
- T. S. Eliot – poet, essayist, playwright, and critic
- Francis Fergusson – teacher and critic
- John Gould Fletcher – Imagist poet associated with the Southern Agrarians
- Harold Elsdale Goad – British writer, journalist, and poet known for his work promoting fascism
- Ross J. S. Hoffman – historian and conservative intellectual
- John Brinckerhoff Jackson – architecture critic, critic of Nazism
- Randall Jarrell – poet and critic associated with the Southern Agrarians
- Douglas Francis Jerrold – editor of The English Review, known as a vocal supporter of Italian fascism
- Janet Lewis – novelist and poet
- Wyndham Lewis – painter and author, co-founder of Vorticism; wrote sympathetically about Adolf Hitler, recanting his support a few years later
- Andrew Nelson Lytle – novelist, academic, and Southern Agrarian
- Louis MacNeice – Irish poet and playwright
- Henri Massis – French essayist, literary critic, and historian
- Vincent McNabb – Irish priest known for work in apologetics
- Paul Elmer More – journalist, literary critic, and Christian apologist associated with New Humanism
- José Ortega y Gasset – Spanish liberal philosopher and essayist
- Frank L. Owsley – historian, member of the Southern Agrarians
- Hilary Douglas Clark Pepler – painter, writer, and poet active in distributism
- John Crowe Ransom – writer, educator, and Agrarian known as a leading figure in New Criticism
- Wilbur Schramm – mass communications scholar
- Allen Tate – Southern Agrarian writer who, in a leadership role among the agrarians, also provided some editorial assistance at the Review
- John Donald Wade – writer and member of the Southern Agrarians who, during the 1930s, was known for essays on Southern culture
- Austin Warren – literary critic and academic
- Robert Penn Warren – poet, novelist, and critic associated with the Southern Agrarians and New Criticism
- William Purcell Witcutt – British minister, folklorist, and author, active in distributism
