= Against War and Fascism =

Against War and Fascism may refer to:

- American League Against War and Fascism
  - FIGHT against War and Fascism
- Movement Against War and Fascism, Australia
- Work Against War and Fascism, Finland
- World Committee Against War and Fascism
