= Frederic Taber Cooper =

American editor and writer (1864–1937)

Frederic Taber Cooper Ph.D. (May 27, 1864 – May 20, 1937) was an American editor and writer.

== Life ==
Cooper was born in New York City, graduated from Harvard University in 1886 and obtained an LL.B. from Columbia University in 1887.

On November 29, 1887, he married Edith Redfield in New York. Edith's father Amasa A. Redfield was a New York attorney and author.

In 1888, he was admitted to the New York Bar, but promptly abandoned the practice of law. Returning to Columbia, he obtained an A.M. in 1891, serving as an associate instructor of Latin until 1894. In 1895, Columbia awarded him a Ph.D. and he became an associate professor of Latin and Sanskrit at New York University until 1902.

Professor Cooper was the editor of various periodicals, including The New York Commercial Advertiser (1898-1904), The Forum (1907-1909), and for a short time of the New York Globe. He died in New London, Connecticut, shortly after returning from a trip to Europe on May 20, 1937.

The Ravi D. Goel collection of Frederic Taber Cooper was donated to Yale's Beinecke Library in 2018. The summary states, "The collection consists of correspondence and other papers relating to American editor and author Frederic Taber Cooper. Correspondence includes letters to Cooper from authors, literary scholars, and publishers. Correspondents include: Gertrude Franklin Horn Atherton, Paul Hervey Fox, Coulson Kernahan, Walter Learned, George Barr McCutcheon, Florence Guy Seabury, Louise Morgan Sill, and Ella Wheeler Wilcox, as well as publishers D. Appleton and Company and Henry Holt and Company. Other papers include clippings, legal and financial records, notebooks, printed material, and a small number of writings by others. Writings include a draft fragment, leaf numbered 117, manuscript, corrected, possibly of the novel The octopus (New York: Doubleday, 1901) by Frank Norris."

== Books ==
- Word formation in the Roman Sermo Plebeius. An historical study of the development of vocabulary in vulgar and late Latin, with special reference to the Romance languages. Ph.D. thesis, Columbia College. New York (1895)
- History of the Nineteenth Century in Caricature, with A. B. Maurice (1904)
- The Craftsmanship of Writing (1911)
- Some American Story Tellers (1911)
