= Frank Howard Dodd =

American publisher (1844–1916)

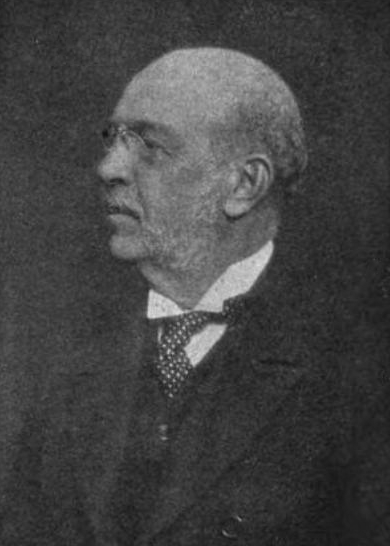
- Born: April 12, 1844; Bloomfield, New Jersey
- Died: January 10, 1916 (aged 71); New York, New York
- Occupation: Publisher
- Spouse: Martha Bliss Parker (m. 1868)
- Children: 4
- Parents: Moses Woodruff Dodd (father); Rachel Dodd (mother)

Frank Howard Dodd (April 12, 1844 – January 10, 1916) was a United States publisher.

== Early life ==
Dodd was born on April 12, 1844, in Bloomfield, New Jersey. He was the second son of Moses Woodruff Dodd (1813–1899) and Rachel (née Hoe) Dodd (1817–1897). He prepared at Bloomfield Academy to enter Yale, but instead went into the New York publishing house of his father, M. W. Dodd.

== Career ==
Upon his father's retirement in 1870, Dodd became the head of M. W. Dodd and entered into a partnership with Edward S. Mead. Six years later Bleecker Van Wagenen joined the firm and the name was changed to Dodd, Mead and Company. Beside publishing books in all departments of literature, the firm, under F. H. Dodd's supervision, founded The Bookman in 1895 and in 1902 The New International Encyclopædia which succeeded the International Cyclopædia of earlier years.

Dodd was president of the American Publishers' Association for a number of years and had various civic and philanthropic interests, being largely instrumental, as president of the Fourth Avenue Association, in the business development of that street. He was a member of the New York Chamber of Commerce and a trustee for the New York Kindergarten Association and the Greenwich Savings Bank. He was a member of the Century Club and City Club of New York, and the National Club of London.

== Personal life ==
In 1868, Dodd married Martha Bliss Parker, a daughter of Joel Parker, president of Union Theological Seminary. Together, they were the parents of four children: Harriet, Katherine, Jane and Edward Dodd.

Dodd died on January 10, 1916, at 333 West 77th Street, his residence in New York City.
