= Moses Woodruff Dodd =

19th-century American publisher

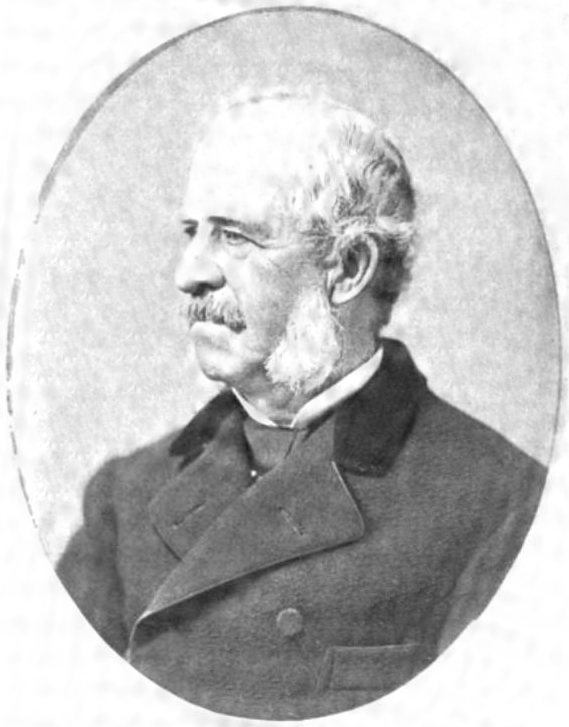
- Born: November 11, 1813; Bloomfield, New Jersey
- Died: April 8, 1899 (aged 85); New York, New York
- Education: Princeton University
- Occupation: Publisher
- Spouse: Rachel Hoe (m. 1841; died 1897)
- Children: 6, including Frank Howard Dodd

Moses Woodruff Dodd (November 11, 1813 – April 8, 1899) was the founder of a publishing company that eventually became Dodd, Mead and Company in New York City.

== Biography ==
Moses Woodruff Dodd was born in Bloomfield, New Jersey on November 11, 1813, the son of Ira Dodd (1786–1869) and Anna Harrison (1785–1867). After graduation at Princeton in 1837, he entered the Princeton Theological Seminary, but he did not graduate because of his health problems. In 1839, he formed a partnership with John S. Taylor, a publisher of New York City. When Taylor retired in 1840, Dodd continued the business under the name of M. W. Dodd until his retirement in 1870.

He died at his home in Manhattan on April 8, 1899.

== Family ==
He had the following siblings:

- Mary Kingsland Dodd (1811–1833)
- Phebe Pierson Dodd (1816–1894)
- Amarintha Dodd (1821–1889).

He married Rachel Hoe (1817–1897) in Brooklyn on May 20, 1831, and had the following children:

- Ira Seymour Dodd (1842–1922)
- Frank Howard Dodd (1844–1916) who took control of the company at his father's retirement.
- Charles Townley Dodd (1846–1917)
- Robert Hoe Dodd (1848–1934)
- William Mead Dodd (1851–1928) who married Jean MacNeill
- Edward Winslow Dodd (1853)

Dodd's granddaughter, Marion Elza Dodd, co-founded the Hampshire Bookshop in Northampton, Massachusetts.
