= Arthur Bartlett Maurice =

American editor (1873–1946)

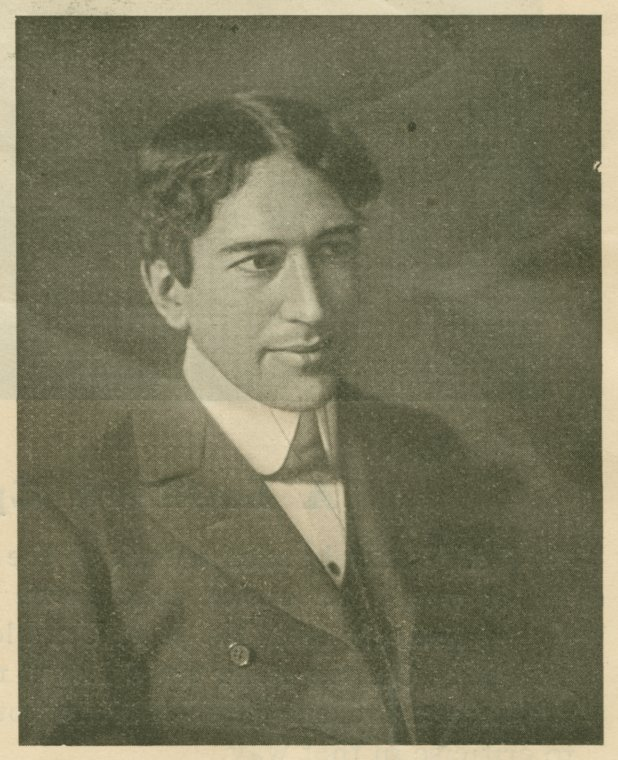
Arthur Bartlett Maurice

Arthur Bartlett Maurice (1873–1946) was an American editor, born in Rahway, New Jersey, and educated at Richmond College, Virginia, and at Princeton. He was an editor of the Woodbridge Township, New Jersey Register in 1895, as city editor of the Elizabeth, New Jersey Daily Herald in 1896, and as special writer for the New York Commercial Advertiser in 1897–98. At 'cThe Bookman'c, he was joint editor from 1899 to 1909 and editor thereafter. He contributed to the New International Encyclopædia and wrote New York in Fiction (1901), History of the Nineteenth Century in Caricature (1904) with F. T. Cooper, and The Paris of the Novelists (1919).
