= Ownership =

Legal concept

Ownership is the state or fact of legal possession and control over property, which may be any asset, tangible or intangible. Ownership can involve multiple rights, collectively referred to as title, which may be separated and held by different parties.

The process and mechanics of ownership are fairly complex: one can gain, transfer, and lose ownership of property in a number of ways. To acquire property one can purchase it with money, trade it for other property, win it in a bet, receive it as a gift, inherit it, find it, receive it as damages, earn it by doing work or performing services, make it, or homestead it. One can transfer or lose ownership of property by selling it for money, exchanging it for other property, giving it as a gift, misplacing it, or having it stripped from one's ownership through legal means such as eviction, foreclosure, seizure, or taking. Ownership implies that the owner of a property also owns any economic benefits or deficits associated with the property.

== History ==
Over the millennia and across cultures, notions regarding what constitutes "property" and how it is treated culturally have varied widely. Ownership is the basis for many other concepts that form the foundations of ancient and modern societies such as money, trade, debt, bankruptcy, the criminality of theft, and private vs. public property. Ownership is the key building block in the development of the capitalist socio-economic system. Adam Smith stated that one of the sacred laws of justice was to guard a person's property and possessions.

== Types of owners ==
=== In person ===
Individuals may own property directly. In some societies only adult men may own property; in other societies (such as the Haudenosaunee), property is matrilinear and passed on from mother to the offspring. In most societies both men and women can own property with no restrictions and limitations at all.

=== Structured ownership entities ===
Throughout history, nations (or governments) and religious organizations have owned property. These entities exist primarily for purposes other than to own or operate property; hence, they may have no clear rules regarding the disposition of their property.

To own and operate property, structures (often known today as legal entities) have been created in many societies throughout history. The differences in how they deal with members' rights is a key factor in determining their type. Each type has advantages and disadvantages derived from their means of recognizing or disregarding (rewarding or not) contributions of financial capital or personal effort.

Cooperatives, corporations, trusts, partnerships, and condominium associations are only some of the many varied types of structured ownership; each type has many subtypes. Legal advantages or restrictions on various types of structured ownership have existed in many societies past and present. To govern how assets are to be used, shared, or treated, rules and regulations may be legally imposed or internally adopted or decreed.

==== Liability for the group or for others in the group ====
Ownership by definition does not necessarily imply a responsibility to others for actions regarding the property. A "legal shield" is said to exist if the entity's legal liabilities do not get redistributed among the entity's owners or members. An application of this, to limit ownership risks, is to form a new entity (such as a shell company) to purchase, own and operate each property. Since the entity is separate and distinct from others, if a problem occurs which leads to a massive liability, the individual is protected from losing more than the value of that one property. Many other properties are protected, when owned by other distinct entities.

In the loosest sense of group ownership, a lack of legal framework, rules and regulations may mean that group ownership of property places each member in a position of responsibility (liability) for the actions of every other member. A structured group duly constituted as an entity under law may still not protect members from being personally liable for each other's actions. Court decisions against the entity itself may give rise to unlimited personal liability for each and every member. An example of this situation is a professional partnership (e.g. law practice) in some jurisdictions. Thus, being a partner or owner in a group may give little advantage in terms of share ownership while producing a lot of risk to the partner, owner or participant.

==== Sharing gains ====
At the end of each fiscal year, accounting rules determine a surplus or profit, which may be retained inside the entity or distributed among owners according to the initial setup intent when the entity was created. For public corporations, common shareholders have no right to receive any of the profit.

Entities with a member focus will give financial surplus back to members according to the volume of financial activity that the participating member generated for the entity. Examples of this are producer cooperatives, buyer cooperatives and participating whole life policyholders in both mutual and share-capital insurance companies.

Entities with shared voting rights that depend on financial capital distribute surplus among shareholders without regard to any other contribution to the entity. Depending on internal rules and regulations, certain classes of shares have the right to receive increases in financial "dividends" while other classes do not. After many years the increase over time is substantial if the business is profitable. Examples of this are common shares and preferred shares in private or publicly listed share capital corporations.

Entities with a focus on providing service in perpetuam do not distribute financial surplus; they must retain it. It will then serve as a cushion against losses or as a means to finance growth activities. Examples of this are not-for-profit entities: they are allowed to make profits, but are not permitted to give any of it back to members except by way of discounts in the future on new transactions.

Depending on the charter at the foundation of the entity, and depending on the legal framework under which the entity was created, the form of ownership is determined once and for all time. To change it requires significant work in terms of communicating with stakeholders (member-owners, governments, etc.) and acquiring their approval. Whatever structural constraints or disadvantages exist at the creation thus remain an integral part of the entity. Common in, for instance, New York City, Hamburg, and Berlin is a form of real estate ownership known as a cooperative (also co-operative or co-op, in German Wohnungsgenossenschaft – apartment co-operative, also "Wohnbaugenossenschaft" or simply "Baugenossenschaft") which relies heavily on internal rules of operation instead of the legal framework governing condominium associations. These "co-ops", owning the building for the mutual benefit of its members, can ultimately perform most of the functions of a legally constituted condominium, i.e. restricting use appropriately and containing financial liabilities to within tolerable levels. To change their structure now that they are up and operating would require significant effort to achieve acceptance among members and various levels of government.

==== Sharing use ====
The owning entity makes rules governing use of property; each property may comprise areas that are made available to any and every member of the group to use. When the group is the entire nation, the same principle is in effect whether the property is small (e.g. picnic rest stops along highways) or large (such as national parks, highways, ports, and publicly owned buildings). Smaller examples of shared use include common areas such as lobbies, entrance hallways and passages to adjacent buildings.

One disadvantage of communal ownership, known as the Tragedy of the Commons, occurs where unlimited unrestricted and unregulated access to a resource (e.g. pasture land) destroys the resource because of over-exploitation. The benefits of exploitation accrue to individuals immediately, while the costs of policing or enforcing appropriate use, and the losses dues to over exploitation, are distributed among many, and are only visible to these gradually.

In a communist nation, the means of production of goods would be owned communally by all people of that nation; the original thinkers did not specify rules and regulations.

=== Ownership models ===
- State ownership: ownership of an industry, asset, or enterprise by the state or a public body representing a community as opposed to an individual or private party.
  - Public ownership: ownership and operation of an enterprise by a central government; also an ambiguous term that could refer to either social, partial state, or full state ownership.
- Private ownership: exclusive ownership of property by non-governmental legal entities.
  - Fractional ownership: ownership held in percentage shares of an expensive asset, sold to individual owners, who are charged fees for the asset's management and variable use.
- Collective ownership: either joint ownership of an economic entity (e.g., a cooperative) or public ownership.
  - Cooperative ownership: ownership by the people who together operate and trade with an enterprise.
  - Common ownership non-exclusive ownership of property by everyone involuntarily.
- Property is also distinguished by whether it is movable (personal property) or immovable (immovable property and real property).
- Property can also be distinguished by whether or not it is owned with exclusive rights, such rights grant owners a monopoly to refuse ownership to non-owners.
- Concerning ownership of means of production and delineating which groups receive the direct profits, capitalism's private ownership is distinguished from socialism's social ownership.
- Ownership of resources can be distinguished as either as individual or communal, analogous to private or public in delineating who has rights of use.

== Types of property ==
=== Personal property ===
Personal property is a type of property. In the common law systems personal property may also be called chattels. It is distinguished from real property, or real estate. In the civil law systems personal property is often called movable property or movables – any property that can be moved from one location or another. This term is used to distinguish property that different from immovable property or immovables, such as land and buildings. This also means the direct owner of the item(s) is in full control of them/it until either stolen, confiscated by law enforcement, or destroyed.

Personal property may be classified in a variety of ways, such as goods, money, negotiable instruments, securities, and intangible assets including choses in action.

=== Land ownership ===
Real estate or immovable property is a legal term (in some jurisdictions) that encompasses land along with anything permanently affixed to the land, such as buildings. Real estate (immovable property) is often considered synonymous with real property. However, for technical purposes, some people prefer to distinguish real estate, referring to the land and fixtures themselves, from real property, referring to ownership rights over real estate. The terms real estate and real property are used primarily in common law, while civil law jurisdictions refer instead to immovable property.

In law, the word real means relating to a thing (from Latin reālis, ultimately from rēs, 'matter' or 'thing'), as distinguished from a person. Thus the law broadly distinguishes between real property (land and anything affixed to it) and personal property (everything else, e.g., clothing, furniture, money). The conceptual difference is between immovable property, which would transfer title along with the land, and movable property, which a person would retain title to.

With the development of private property ownership, real estate has become a major area of business.

=== Corporations and legal entities ===
An individual or group of individuals can own shares in corporations and other legal entities, but do not necessarily own the entities themselves. A legal entity is a legal construct through which the law allows a group of natural persons to act as if it were an individual for certain purposes.

Some duly incorporated entities may not be owned by individuals nor by other entities; they exist without being owned once they are created. Not being owned, they cannot be bought and sold. Mutual life insurance companies, credit unions, foundations and cooperatives, not for profit organizations, and public corporations are examples of this. No person can purchase the company, as their ownership is not legally available for sale, neither as shares nor as a single whole.

=== Intellectual property ===
Intellectual property (IP) refers to a legal entitlement which sometimes attaches to the expressed form of an idea, or to some other intangible subject matter. This legal entitlement generally enables its holder to exercise exclusive rights of use in relation to the subject matter of the IP. The term intellectual property reflects the idea that this subject matter is the product of the mind or the intellect, and that IP rights may be protected at law in the same way as any other form of property.

Intellectual property laws confer a bundle of exclusive rights in relation to the particular form or manner in which ideas or information are expressed or manifested, and not in relation to the ideas or concepts themselves (see idea-expression divide). The term "intellectual property" denotes the specific legal rights which authors, inventors and other IP holders may hold and exercise, and not the intellectual work itself.

Intellectual property laws are designed to protect different forms of intangible subject matter, although in some cases there is a degree of overlap.

- Copyright may subsist in creative and artistic works (e.g. books, movies, music, paintings, photographs and software), giving a copyright holder the exclusive right to control reproduction or adaptation of such works for a certain period of time.
- A patent may be granted in relation to an invention that is new, useful and not simply an obvious advancement over what existed when the application was filed. A patent gives the holder an exclusive right to commercially exploit the invention for a certain period of time (typically 20 years from the filing date of a patent application).
- A trademark is a distinctive sign which is used to distinguish the products or services of one business from those of another business.
- An industrial design right protects the form of appearance, style or design of an industrial object (e.g. spare parts, furniture or textiles).
- A trade secret (also known as "confidential information") is an item of confidential information concerning the commercial practices or proprietary knowledge of a business.

Patents, trademarks and designs fall into a particular subset of intellectual property known as industrial property.

Like other forms of property, intellectual property (or rather the exclusive rights which subsist in the IP) can be transferred (with or without consideration) or licensed to third parties. In some jurisdictions it is possible to use intellectual property as collateral for a loan.

The basic public policy rationale for the protection of intellectual property is that IP laws facilitate and encourage disclosure of innovation into the public domain for the common good, by granting authors and inventors exclusive rights to exploit their works and invention for a limited period.

However, various schools of thought are critical of the very concept of intellectual property, and some characterise IP as intellectual protectionism. There is ongoing debate as to whether IP laws truly operate to confer the stated public benefits, and whether the protection they are said to provide is appropriate in the context of innovation derived from such things as traditional knowledge and folklore, and patents for software and business methods. Manifestations of this controversy can be seen in the way different jurisdictions decide whether to grant intellectual property protection in relation to subject matter of this kind, and the stark divide on issues of the role and scope of intellectual property laws.

=== Chattel slavery ===
The term "Slavery" is commonly understood to refer to chattel slavery.

The living human body is, in modern societies, considered something which cannot be the property of anyone but the person whose body it is. Its opposite, in which the person in the body does not own their body, is chattel slavery. Chattel slavery was defined as the absolute legal ownership of a person, including the legal right to buy and sell them. Persons who were so enslaved did not have the freedom to direct their own actions, and their legal rights were either severely limited or nonexistent. The Antebellum period in the United States is considered both the worst for the exploitation of chattel slaves, and also where the practice aroused such fierce opposition and support that it led to the American Civil War.

Chattel slavery is currently (2020) illegal in every country in the world. However, until the 19th century slavery in one form or another existed in most societies and was thought of as the normal state of things; slaves of whatever ethnicity were considered racially inferior. Notwithstanding the illegality of enslavement, virtual slavery still exists in various forms today, although called by other names.

== Critical views ==
The question of ownership reaches back to the ancient philosophers, Plato and Aristotle, who held different opinions on the subject. Plato (428/427 BC – 348/347 BC) thought private property created divisive inequalities, while Aristotle (384 BC – 322 BC) thought private property enabled people to receive the full benefit of their labor. Private property can circumvent what is now referred to as the "tragedy of the commons" problem, where people tend to degrade common property more than they do private property. While Aristotle justified the existence of private ownership, he left two open questions

1. how to allocate property between what is private and common, and
2. how to allocate the private property within society

=== Modern Western views ===
In modern western politics, some people believe that exclusive ownership of property underlies much social injustice, and facilitates tyranny and oppression on an individual and societal scale. Others consider the striving to achieve greater ownership of wealth as the driving factor behind human innovation and technological advancement and increasing standards of living. Some support the latter view, believing that ownership is necessary for liberty itself, while others believe liberty is only possible with absolute relinquishment of ownership.

=== Ownership society ===
Ownership society was a political slogan used by United States President George W. Bush to promote a series of policies aimed to increase the control of individual citizens over health care and social security payments and policies. Critics have claimed that slogan hid an agenda that sought to implement tax cuts and curtail the government's role in health care and retirement saving.

== See also ==
- Bubuti system
- Cadastre
- Dominium
- Ownership society
- Possession (law)
- State (or public) ownership
