= American Publishers Association =

- Founded: 1901
- Location: Chicago, Illinois

American Publishers Association (APA) was created in 1901 to maintain the price of copyright books in the American market.

In 1913, the New York Supreme court ruled in favor of R. H Macy's & Co. vs American Publishers Association, saying Macy's was entitled to damages of $140,000.

Its founding members were Charles Scribner as president, Gen. Alexander C. McClurg and George Mifflin as Vice Presidents, George Platt Brett, Sr., of Macmillan Publishers, as Secretary, and G. B. M. Harvey, of Harper Brothers, as treasurer.

== Notable members ==
- Frank Dodd, Dodd, Mead and Company, former President of the American Publishers Association

== See also ==
- Books in the United States
