= Boston (novel) =

1928 novel by Upton Sinclair

- First edition
- Author: Upton Sinclair
- Language: English
- Genre: Political fiction
- Publisher: Albert & Charles Boni
- Publication date: 1928
- Publication place: United States
- Media type: Print (hardcover)
- Pages: 755 (2 vols. numbered continuously)

Boston is a novel by Upton Sinclair. It is a "documentary novel" that combines the facts of the case with journalistic depictions of actual participants and fictional characters and events. Sinclair mixed his fictional characters into the prosecution and execution of Sacco and Vanzetti.

== Research and writing ==
Sinclair worked from a passionate conviction that the executions of Sacco and Vanzetti constituted "the most shocking crime that has been committed in American history since the assassination of Abraham Lincoln" and a belief that "It will empoison our public life for a generation."

He interviewed Bartolomeo Vanzetti twice and conducted research following the execution of Sacco and Vanzetti in 1927. For his central character he used as his model a California acquaintance who recounted stories of her earlier life amid Boston's aristocracy. As part of his research he attended the funeral of a Boston industrialist. He recognized that some of his readers might find that disrespectful and offered this defense: "if you are a novelist you think about 'copy' and not about anybody's feelings, even your own." To verify dialogue, he even contacted a journalist to verify his fidelity in transcribing a jailhouse conversation. As a result, he avoided repeating the oft-quoted description of Sacco and Vanzetti, falsely attributed to Vanzetti, as "a good shoemaker and a poor fish peddler." In hundreds of letters he sought to acquire and verify details, such as the timing and physical setting of prison visits. He asked other correspondents to review parts of the manuscript for errors.

Another bit of his research has attracted periodic interest and political criticism. He interviewed Fred Moore, who served as defense attorney for the murder trial. Moore offered his opinion that Sacco was probably guilty of the payroll robbery, while Vanzetti might have known of plans for the robbery but not participated. Opponents of Sinclair's politics contend that his failure to adapt Moore's judgment in the novel constitutes a betrayal of his documentary claims. Sinclair, on the other hand, did not consider Moore's estimation determinative and Moore never claimed that either defendant had ever confessed his guilt to him. Much like the principal characters in the novel, Sinclair claimed no certain knowledge, only his instinct: "I did not know and could only guess." Later research has documented that Moore told Sinclair that the two were guilty and that he had contrived their alibis. Following the novel's publication, Sinclair wrote in a private letter to John Beardsley that this had presented him with "the most difficult ethical problem of my life", but he had not altered the presentation he had planned for his novel, as everyone with whom he had spoken who had in-depth knowledge of the case had given him contradictory reports as to the guilt or innocence of Sacco and Vanzetti. "So you see that in the end I don't really know any more about the thing than I did in the beginning, and can only take my stand as I did in "Boston", upon the thesis that men should not be executed upon anybody's rumors."

In sum, he wrote: "Some of the things I told displeased the fanatical believers; but having portrayed the aristocrats as they were, I had to do the same thing for the anarchists." He expanded on the situation in a letter:

All these matters are terribly complicated....my problem was the hardest I have ever faced in my life.... It is my belief that if I had taken an entirely naive attitude toward the Sacco-Vanzetti defense, and represented the defense as all white and prosecution as all black, I would have done very little good to the case, because too many people know the truth, and it is bound to come out sooner or later. The only thing I would accomplish would be to destroy entirely my own reputation as a trustworthy writer. I have never hesitated about my own reputation where it was in a good cause. But I really could not see any sense in making myself foolish to no purpose.

A detailed analysis of Sinclair's "investigative method" cites a number of questionable assertions, but concludes that in Boston "one discovers a fidelity to the factual record which is seldom met with in historical novels."

== Publication ==
Sinclair met with attorneys in New York City to make final changes to the text to allay their fears of libel suits.

The novel first appeared serially in The Bookman between February and November 1928 under the title "Boston, a Contemporary Historical Novel" and was then published in 2 volumes by Albert & Charles Boni that same year.

It has since been republished in one volume as Boston: A Novel and then Boston: A Documentary Novel.

It has been published as well in at least 15 other languages.

Sinclair hoped Boston would win the Pulitzer Prize, but the chairman of the 1928 Pulitzer Prize Committee said his personal opinion was that its "socialistic tendencies" and "special pleading" made it unsuitable. (Note: The committee chair was Dr. Richard S. Burton, who described himself as "a lecturer on current literature" and later said his remarks had been "distorted". Harris misidentifies him as Richard K. Burton.) When the Committee named John B. Oliver's Victim and Victor instead, Sinclair denounced the selection in a widely distributed letter that pointed out how that novel was as argumentative as Boston only for a more respectable cause. In the end, the Pulitzer advisory committee at the Columbia University School of Journalism overrode the Committee's choice and awarded the Pulitzer to Julia Peterkin's Scarlet Sister Mary.

== Criticism ==
Boston met with a largely favorable reception, though some found difficulties with its political perspective or its length and detail. One scholarly assessment a few years after its publication located it in the tradition of the realistic and socially conscious novel, a successor to Dickens' Hard Times, Uncle Tom's Cabin, and the novels and plays of Galsworthy. In this view, Boston "compares favorably with its predecessors of the eighteenth and nineteenth centuries." Though Boston is "fifty percent pamphlet," Sinclair's "mingling of actual and fictitious characters...has brought the historical novel up to date, and created a new form of realism." Yet even this critic thought the novel could have proved more persuasive. "One suspects that the patently biased comment of the author weakens rather than strengthens his case, and that greater artfulness in presenting the facts might have brought the disinterested or disaffected reader into more active sympathy with his viewpoint." Though allowing that some readers will be irritated by Sinclair's broad attack on private property, this critic concluded that "whatever the reaction to the doctrine it sets forth, no one can doubt the eloquence of the plea."

Publications that sympathized with Sinclair's politics greeted Boston with glowing reviews. The Nation compared him favorably to Dickens and Fielding. The New York Times, normally quite critical, praised it apart from its politics as "a literary achievement...wrought into a narrative on the heroic scale with form and coherence," demonstrating "a craftsmanship in the technique of the novel that the author has seldom displayed before." Others voicing enthusiasm included his sometime political adversary Lewis Mumford ("it has the finality of truth and art") and Arthur Conan Doyle ("the Zola of America").

Sinclair's failure to avow the innocence of Sacco and Vanzetti brought denunciations from the political left, including former allies. One called him "a hired liar, a coward and a traitor." During the novel's serial publication, he even feared that "some anarchist might think it his duty to keep me from finishing the book."

== Synopsis ==
Chapter 1: The Runaway Grandmother

The summer of 1915. The Thornwell estate outside of Boston. Cornelia Thornwell, aged 60, is suddenly widowed after 40 disappointing years of marriage: "she had lived, a prisoner in a cell." (31) The family is patrician and powerful, part of New England's economic and cultural elite. Her 3 daughters, all married to millionaires, squabble over their inheritances during funeral preparations. They continue their disputes as relations and retainers assemble for the reading of the will. Cornelia sees their behavior as "the revelation of hidden natures." "Trembling with excitement," (32) she pens a farewell note declaring herself a "runaway grandmother" (33) and asking the family not to pursue her. She leaves by a back stairway.

Chapter 2: Plymouth Rock

Calling herself Mrs. Cornell, Cornelia finds work at a cordage plant in Plymouth, a town not far from Boston. She learns how hard factory work is and how hard the life of the poor. She boards with the Brini family and becomes friends with their other boarder, Bartolomeo Vanzetti, an Italian immigrant ditch digger, atheist, anarchist, and pacifist. She first thinks his political beliefs naive, "a dreamer of dreams, so simple of mind as to have no conception of the odds against him," (56) especially his opposition to reformers and all organizations, even unions. Early in 1916, shortly after a public meeting Vanzetti and his anarchist comrades hold to promote their ideas, a spontaneous strike breaks out.

Chapter 3: Dago Red

Cornelia participates in the strike, learns how the police work for the plant's management and attack picketers. The courts do no more than "give the police a mild rebuke for their conduct." (74) Vanzetti acquires a rusty gun, though only to protect a visiting speaker, the anarchist theoretician Galleani. Cornelia hears echoes in his speech of Thoreau and Emerson. She witnesses Vanzetti getting into violent arguments that contrast with his gentle nature. The strike ends after a month and the workers have won a raise but at the cost of lost wages. "Little by little, Cornelia came to understand the type of idealist-fanatic, which could be gentle as a child in all personal relationships, but fierce and dangerous when roused by social wrong." (82)

Chapter 4: Young America

One day by chance Cornelia meets her favorite granddaughter, Betty Arvin, who is excited to learn of Cornelia's year. Cornelia confesses her new attachment to pacifism even as her relatives profit from war. Betty visits the Brinis and meets Vanzetti, who explains that he is no pacifist, that he believes there are powerful people to be fought. He condemns the war in Europe and tells his life story. Betty writes Cornelia letters and reports how her enthusiasm for women's rights scares off her suitors. Cornelia attends an anarchist-sponsored picnic and a play attacking militarism in which Nicola Sacco appears. Late in November 1916, Rupert and Deborah Arvin arrive in Plymouth, having learned Cornelia's address from one of Betty's letters. Cornelia defends her views on war even as they accuse her of poisoning Betty's mind. Cornelia agrees to return to Boston to reconcile Betty and her parents. She finds the situation there already calmed and decides to return to Boston but live apart from the family, imagining she and Betty can share their ideas but only with one another.

Chapter 5: The Saving Minority

Cornelia, now living in a modest apartment, speaks against U.S. involvement in the war despite her family's objections. Vanzetti leaves for Mexico, mistakenly afraid he might be drafted. Cornelia and Betty march in a pacifist demonstration, provoking another family battle. Cornelia visits Jerry Walker and his family. Cornelia understands how his business plans are being frustrated by the banking establishment, members of her own family. Fall 1917. Betty enters Radcliffe and lives with her grandmother. In reaction to the Bolshevik Revolution, "city policemen, federal secret agents, and an army of spies and informers" (149) wage a violent and illegal campaign on behalf of people of property. They seize a letter from Vanzetti to Cornelia. The ensuing family battle engages Cornelia and Betty against her mother Deborah. Vanzetti appears at Cornelia's door.

Chapter 6: White Terror

Cornelia's sons-in-law, Henry Cabot Winters and Rupert Alvin, lie to her about their manipulations to put Walker out of business. He is ruined. The war ends. Cornelia and Betty are arrested marching with suffragists. Another Thornwell family council ensues. Government authorities terrorize everyone the political left. Vanzetti is now selling fish from a cart. Cornelia is dismayed to hear how Betty is not fazed to imagine Vanzetti in a gunfight with the police: "Where had she acquired that matter-of-fact smile, discussing the mad idea of resisting arrest?" (181) Betty leaves for Europe chaperoned by a distant cousin. Cornelia confounds the family by joining her. They travel to Russia.

Chapter 7: Deportation Days

The Boston police strike. Betty stays on in Budapest and Cornelia returns. Only Vanzetti and the anarchists want to learn what she has seen. She attends Christmas celebrations with the Thornwells and the Brinis. Both comment on reports of a payroll holdup in Braintree. Anarchists are being deported. Hundreds are arrested and Cornelia works on their behalf. Vanzetti is working on propaganda, believes anarchist mail bombs are the work of provocateurs, and describes how torture makes anarchists swear to false confessions. Betty has lost her chaperon, so Cornelia will join her for a vacation on the Italian lakes. As Cornelia is sailing to Europe, Vanzetti is arrested for the Braintree holdup.

Chapter 8: The Detective Machine

The police identify suspects in two robberies and then develop facts to make their case. Arrested, Vanzetti lies to avoid implicating any of his fellow anarchists. He is the only suspect without an acceptable American alibi. News reaches Cornelia in Italy with Betty, her suitor Joe Randall, an American social democrat, and a French communist named Pierre Leon. In a long discussion of political philosophy, Pierre warns that he has known anarchists to be capable of violence, making his point to Cornelia by citing John Brown. The two women and Joe rush to Boston for the trial and visit Vanzetti in jail. They try to help locate evidence and witnesses. Vanzetti cannot testify on his own behalf without alienating the jury as an anarchist, atheist, and draft dodger.

Chapter 9: The Web of Fate

Vanzetti's trial for the Braintree attempted robbery. Judge Thayer seats a jury of Anglo-Saxons. Attorneys on both sides are friends. Prosecution witnesses alter testimony to fit the prosecution's theory. Only Italians provide an alibi for Vanzetti. Counter witnesses describe Vanzetti's mustache. The jurors handle bullets introduced as evidence. The judge's charge to the jury is not fully recorded. After the guilty verdict, Vanzetti writes letters from prison. The Thornwells are concerned about Joe's background. The family weathers the post-war deflation and squeezes the only Jewish banker out. Charles Ponzi, an Italian immigrant, launches the scheme that will bear his name. Walker distresses Alvin and Winter with a lawsuit even as they plot to defeat radicals in Italy as they have in other European countries.

Chapter 10: The Legal System

Cornelia finds that an establishment lawyer expects to be paid thousands. Facing the prosecution of Sacco and Vanzetti for the Braintree robbery-murder, the anarchists select Lee Swenson as defense attorney. He is experienced in criminal cases arising from labor disputes. Cornelia briefs Swenson about the defendants, describing Sacco as a man who "does very little thinking." (291) Swenson explains that the government's dishonest prosecution, a "frame-up," (295) needs to be fought with the same methods. He will need to "build a good alibi." (296) Cornelia recognizes that she has been invited to commit perjury and "moral whirlwinds seize her thoughts." (299) She considers how lies prove effective in business and politics. The next day Betty announces she and Joe now consider themselves married without benefit of law or clergy. Cornelia will permit them to use her apartment rather than announce this to the family. Swenson reports that a certain Mrs. De Falco has offered to serve as intermediary for a bribe that will get the government will drop the case.

Chapter 11: The Graft Ring

The anarchist supporters want to pay the bribe, but Swenson frustrates them by publicly denouncing the scheme. Betty's mother receives an anonymous letter threatening to reveal her daughter's indiscretions. She and Cornelia debate "the ethics of free love versus purchased love." (323) Betty's older sister Priscilla's wedding. Vanzetti is upset that the justice system will condemn Mrs. De Falco, the least guilty party in the bribery scheme. He predicts that Lee's refusal to accept the bribery system will make the prosecution redouble their anti-radical efforts. More poison pen letters reach the Thornwells. When Cornelia's grandson Josiah is blackmailed for sexual misbehavior, the family's history of secret affairs is discussed along with similar behavior on the part of Boston's ruling elite and occasional bribes. Mrs. De Falco is found not guilty, but the prosecution responds as Vanzetti predicted.

Chapter 12: Shadows Before

Swenson is joined by attorney Fred Moore and they struggle to identify and prepare witnesses. Accounts of unreliable witnesses and others pressured to testify or to withhold information. Too much critical evidence will be discovered too late. Swenson, pessimistic about his case, confronts Cornelia and proposes she perjure herself to provide the defendants with an alibi. Cornelia can not agree to do so, even though "what was supposed to be justice was really class greed." (365) The narrator's voice proposes that by adhering to her principles she hopes to maintain: "your exclusiveness, your idea that you were something special, apart from the harsh, rough world—in short that you were 'Boston'!" (366) Just before the start of the trial, mass displays of patriotism mark Memorial Day. Cornelia attends a ceremony naming a street intersection for her grandnephew who died in France. She weeps for the dead of the wars the nation is now arming to fight.

Chapter 13: Trial by Jury

The scene as the Dedham trial opens, with the defendants seated in a steel cage. Judge Thayer speaks his mind to reporters, but newspaper owners decide what gets into print. Corrupted witnesses testify, and the judge intervenes with obvious prejudice. He is careful that his recorded words do not reflect the bias he shows by his body language. Walker's case against the bankers is moving forward and will make the lives of Cornelia's relations difficult. In the course of arbitrating a family marital squabble, she learns how her relations are working to punish government officials who have opposed their interests. The trial continues with testimony that proves little but has a cumulative effect. The defense struggles with a dishonest court interpreter. Ballistics testimony is crafted for Thayer to misuse in his eventual summary to the jury, though a key witness will withdraw his statements 2 years later.

Chapter 14: Judge Fury

Cornelia and the Thornwells attend her grandson's Harvard graduation. Defense witnesses are mostly Italians and all struggle under aggressive cross examination. Vanzetti, his English improved while in prison, testifies and recounts his life story. The judge prevents the jury from hearing about the government's persecution of anarchists, his reason for fearing arrest. The cross examination emphasizes his sojourn in Mexico as a draft dodger. Sacco's testimony is less disciplined and the prosecution mocks him on cross. Thayer invites Cornelia to his chambers and they have an angry confrontation. The judge, alleging he was misquoted, lies to a reporter. The defense is short of funds, so Cornelia sells some of her jewels to her daughter Deborah. Swenson has run out of witnesses and directly proposes perjury to Cornelia, who responds with a distraught "Don't ask me!" (434) Summations are followed by Thayer's charge to the jury, mostly about loyalty and a prejudiced restatement of the evidence. The jury returns its verdict: both guilty on all counts.

Chapter 15: The Whispering Gallery

Swenson withdraws and Moore takes over motions and appeals. Cornelia's plans to speak in New York rouse her relations. She discusses the affair at length with Henry Cabot Winters. Cornelia admits knowing little of Sacco. She thinks Vanzetti capable of a violent rage if confronting the police, but never of a cold-blooded murder. She insists on the unfairness of the trial, Winters on the violence inherent in the defendants' philosophy. Cornelia describes the violence she has witnessed. Betty joins this "duel of moral forces." (463) When Betty announces that Joe's divorce is final and they plan to wed, Cornelia weeps, pretending she is happy for the couple, but her tears reflect the evening's arguments. "Women, who have been but a short time emancipated, do not defy and insult the mighty males of their clan without terrific inner disturbances." (467) The press reports of the wedding of the press agent for the Sacco-Vanzetti Defense to a Boston blue blood are sensational. The defense uncovers new evidence and witnesses change their testimony, all to no avail.

Chapter 16: The Law's Delay

Jerry Walker's case against the banking establishment takes place in the same Dedham courtroom and lasts a year. Cornelia watches her son-in-law Rupert Arvin manage the defense's systematic lies and feigned forgetfulness. Vanzetti studies and writes in prison, while Sacco finds it harder to bear. At different times, each attempts a hunger strike, resulting in psychiatric examination and treatment. The Catholic Church campaigns against a constitutional amendment banning child labor. Judge Thayer continues to deny defense motions with tortured logic and misrepresentations of the defense arguments. He alienates friends and colleagues with his anti-anarchist rants. Walker wins a jury verdict and stands to receive more than $10 million. Managing the appeal, Rupert Arvin analyzes social connections to members of the Supreme Judicial Court through club memberships and personal ties, nothing crude. Winters transfers all his property to his sister so he can claim to be bankrupt and avoid any payment to Walker. Cornelia attends a family baptism and ponders the words "vain pomp and glory." (508)

Chapter 17: The Mills of the Law

Betty has a baby and allows it to be baptized. Moore's efforts are undermined by anarchist supporters and he resigns. William G. Thompson, a patrician lawyer replaces him, but he antagonizes the anarchists because he has no interest in mobilizing public opinion. His appeal to the elderly judges on the Supreme Judicial Court, all "products of the spoils system" (519) in Cornelia's view, fails. The defense develops more exculpatory evidence, including a confession by Constance Madeiros that he and the Morelli gang committed the crime. Thayer again denies a motion for a new trial, this time citing dialogue that is not in the court record. Cornelia at least manages to have Madeiros' execution for a different crime postponed. The Supreme Judicial Court hears the appeal in the Walker case and in March 1927 overturns the jury verdict: "property was safe." (532) The court also backs Thayer on the Madeiros matter. Thayer then moves promptly to sentencing. In final statements, Sacco is hardly articulate, while Vanzetti is eloquent and speaks "as one who is addressing posterity." (535) Thayer places all responsibility on the jury and the Supreme Judicial Court and then sentences the pair to be executed.

Chapter 18: The Supersalesman

The focus is now on Governor Fuller, a man "cold as marble, utterly selfish," (542) who can issue pardons or commute sentences. The press begins to reconsider its negative view of the accused. The Governor is deluged with letters he ignores. Cornelia, now 72, has her son-in-law Winters sound out the Governor. Winters finds that Fuller only knows what the police tell him and does not want to be contradicted: "stubbornness is his leading quality." (547) Cornelia decides to campaign behind the scenes to get Fuller to appoint a commission to review the case on his behalf, working through her upper class connections to get the Episcopal bishop to make the suggestion. Felix Frankfurter demolishes Thayer in a magazine article. Fuller conducts his own review, but he is only pretending. The bishop asks the governor to create an Advisory Commission and Fuller does. Cornelia continues to raise money from "a small minority of choice spirits." (566) The division of opinion within the Thornwell family mirrors that of the public.

Chapter 19: Academic Autocracy

The Advisory Commission is headed by Harvard President Lowell, who has "a remarkable talent for ungraciousness." (579) It reviews evidence and hears witnesses in secrecy. Portraits of the 3 commissioners. Cornelia is quickly disabused of any hope for an impartial review. She is near despair. The governor visits Sacco and Vanzetti in prison, but he is still play-acting. New exculpatory evidence is discovered and presented but all for naught. The defenders are in anguish. Finally, Cornelia arranges to meet with the governor. He is perfectly polite and promises to consider her views, but clearly does not grasp the details of the case.

Chapter 20: The Decision

Worldwide attention is focused on the governor, who releases his decision late at night in order to have the next morning's headlines to himself. The advocates for Sacco and Vanzetti are angry and mock his conclusion that "The proceedings were without flaw." (610) Cornelia is exhausted and imagines she can only leave the battle to the next generation. She is comforted by Vanzetti's words in an interview he gave earlier: "This is our career and our triumph." (613) The narrator hails Vanzetti: "You have spoken the noblest word heard in America in the two generations since Abraham Lincoln died." (616) The governor's account of the case is so poor it needs to be buttressed by that of the Advisory Commission. Details of evidence are reviewed again. Cornelia is crushed by the Commission's report, since Lowell "was her kind of person, the best she had to offer." (620) Lawyers undertake fruitless legal manoeuvres. A demonstration on Boston Common is broken up by the police. Cornelia has some of her relatives host a dinner for the governor where they plead with him to delay the executions out of concern for Cornelia. Picketers at the State House are arrested. Betty quotes Lenin: "The state is a monopoly of violence." (634) Sacco and Vanzetti write farewell letters. Their executions are postponed with only minutes to spare.

Chapter 21: Days of Grace

Cornelia sees Vanzetti in prison again. The police fear a general strike. Cornelia's college-age grandson joins the cause as do artists like Dos Passos and many unknown who "came as individuals, hesitating and confused." (652) They argue legal strategy vs. propaganda. Police break up demonstrations but avoid creating martyrs with arrests. Joe Randall fails to get himself arrested. The Supreme Judicial Court holds a hearing and fails once more to order a new trial. Winters says the legal community agrees reforms are needed, but first "The courts must be sustained." (661) He accompanies Cornelia to visit the governor again. When a lawyer defends the Supreme Judicial Court, Cornelia mocks him because he is arguing against that Court in the Walker trial appeal. The governor asks Cornelia if the men are innocent and she answers: "Of course I don't know that....I believe that they are innocent and I certainly know this—that they have not been proved guilty." (666-7) The governor retorts: "I know that they are guilty, so I don't care whether they had a fair trial or not." (667) His conclusion is based on evidence he has heard, nothing in the trial record. Vanzetti's sister visits him in prison. Both he and Sacco write letters to Sacco's 12-year-old son Dante.

Chapter 22: The City of Fear

Police enforce silence in Boston while worldwide voices grow louder. The defense holds a public meeting in a hall but speakers must limit themselves to generalities. Cornelia arranges for Vanzetti's sister to visit Boston's Catholic Cardinal. Boston has a military presence. On Sunday, August 21, thousands gather on Boston Common and there are scenes of disorder, but people of note are not arrested Supreme Court Justices Homes and Brandeis decline to intervene. Cornelia and her daughter Deborah argue loudly. Cornelia says: "I prefer the dynamiter who cares about justice to the most law-abiding person in the world who doesn't!" (690) She lectures her granddaughter Priscilla about privilege and exploitation. On Monday, with executions scheduled for midnight, a protest of the well known and elite produces arrests, including Edna St. Vincent Millay as well as Betty and Joe, who give statements to the press. Cornelia visits the governor's wife, and then the governor again, to whom shes argues the case succinctly. Finally, trembling, she denounces him, leaves him speechless, and leaves "with despair plainly written upon her aged face." (705)

Chapter 23: The Last Enemy

Final legal activity and meetings. Sacco's relatives visit with the governor. The Thornwell's fear for Cornelia's health. She refuses sleeping powder. Winters tells her that Fuller's decision is based on word that a drunken anarchist revealed that Sacco was in the car used at Braintree and Vanzetti knew about the robbery in advance. Cornelia, "working herself into a cold fury," (714) denounces this evidences based on gossip, unchallenged in court. She gets a pass to visit the prisoners just hours before the executions so she can confront them one last time. She passes through many layers of security and speaks to Vanzetti as Sacco listens. Vanzetti swears innocence and attests to Sacco's. She asks if he has changed his views on violence in the class struggle and he has not. He still belies many will have to die to overthrow the master class. He does not want his death to be avenged. Asked if he forgives his prosecutors and judges, he says he can not say so. He asks Cornelia not to be sad for them because they are just doing their job and dying as anarchists.

Chapter 24: The Triumph

More legal moves. Cornelia says she is reconciled to the executions but her lips tremble as she speaks. Betty is resolute, believing in the class struggle. They wait past midnight until Joe calls to say Sacco and Vanzetti are dead. A step-by-step account of the executions. The prisoners refuse the attention of a chaplain. At his last moment, Vanzetti says: "I wish to forgive some people for what they are now doing to me." (742) The newsmen wire their reports. Demonstrations occur throughout Europe. The narrator summarizes: "And now Massachusetts had made her martyrs, and stood upon her pedestal of self-righteousness." (746-7) Funeral arrangements are met with police restrictions. Police disrupt the funeral procession through Boston to Forest Hills cemetery. A member of the defense committee delivers a brief, eloquent eulogy. The narrator summarizes how their fame spreads and inspires: "To a hundred million groping, and ten times as many still in slumber, the names of Sacco and Vanzetti would be the eternal symbols of a dream, identical with civilization itself, of a human society in which wealth belongs to the producers of wealth, and the rewards of labor are to the laborers." (754-5)

== Characters (partial list) ==
- Cornelia Thornwell, granddaughter of an immigrant, widow of Josiah, mother of 3 daughters
  - Deborah, her eldest daughter, wife of Rupert Alvin
  - Alice, her daughter, wife of Henry Cabot Winters
  - Clara, her youngest daughter, wife of James Scatterbridge, manager of the Thornwell family businesses
- Bartolomeo Vanzetti, an Italian immigrant, anarchist
- Betty Alvin, Cornelia's favorite granddaughter
- Rupert Alvin, president of the Pilgrim National Bank
- Henry Cabot Winters, attorney
- Jerry Walker, a self-made man whose success in monopolizing the felt business in New England the Thornwells resent
- Joe Randall, a Virginian, a moderate leftist, suitor to Betty
- Lee Swenson, an attorney experienced in defending labor
- Webster Thayer, the judge who presided at the trials

== Sources ==
- Anthony Arthur, Radical Innocent: Upton Sinclair (NY: Random House, 2006), ISBN 1-4000-6151-2
- Abraham Blinderman, Critics on Upton Sinclair (Coral Gables, FL: University of Miami Press, 1975)
- William A. Bloodworth, Upton Sinclair (Twayne Publishing, 1977)
- Joseph Blotner, The Modern American Political Novel (Austin: University of Texas Press, 1966)
- Robert D'Attilio, "La Salute è in Voi: the Anarchist Dimension" in Sacco-Vanzetti: Developments and Reconsiderations - 1979, Conference Proceedings (Boston: Trustees of the Public Library of the City of Boston, 1982)
- Carol Vanderveer Hamilton, "American Writers and the Sacco-Vanzetti Case," 2001, accessed June 25, 2010
- Leon Harris, Upton Sinclair, American Rebel (NY: Thomas Y. Crowell Company, 1975)
- G. Louis Joughin and Edmund M. Morgan, The Legacy of Sacco and Vanzetti (NY: Harcourt, Brace and Company, 1948), ch XVI: "The Novels"
- Robert Morss Lovett, Preface to Fiction: A Discussion of Great Modern Novels (Chicago: Thomas S. Rockwell, 1931)
- Kevin Mattson, Upton Sinclair and the Other American Century (Hoboken, NJ: John Wiley & Sons, 2006), ISBN 0-471-72511-0
- John Neville, Twentieth-Century Cause Cèlébre [sic]: Sacco, Vanzetti, and the Press, 1920-1927 (Westport, CT: Praeger, 2004), ISBN 0-275-97783-8. Accents are incorrect in the original.
- Upton Sinclair, The Autobiography of Upton Sinclair (NY: Harcourt, Brace & World, Inc., 1962)
- Upton Sinclair, Boston: A Documentary Novel (Cambridge, MA: Robert Bentley, Inc., 1978), ISBN 0-8376-0420-6
- Upton Sinclair, My Lifetime in Letters (Columbia, MO: University of Missouri Press, 1960)
