= Seward Collins =

American New York socialite and publisher

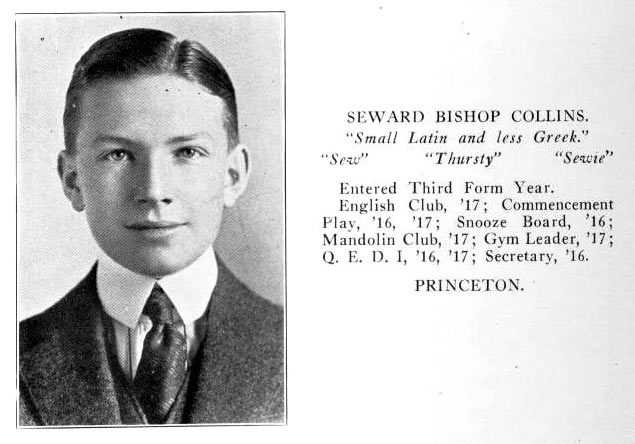
Collins from his 1917 yearbook from The Hill School in Pottstown, Pennsylvania

Seward Bishop Collins (April 22, 1899 – December 8, 1952) was an American New York socialite and publisher. By the end of the 1920s, he was a self-described fascist.

== Early life and education ==
Collins was born in Albion, New York, on April 22, 1899, to an Irish Catholic family. His father Herbert was involved early on in the development of United Cigar Stores, a chain that would eventually grow to over 3,000 locations. He graduated from The Hill School in Pottstown, Pennsylvania, and then from Princeton University.

== Career ==
Collins entered New York's literary life in 1926, as a bon vivant. He knew many literary giants of his day, had an affair with Dorothy Parker, and amassed a large collection of erotica. His bookstore, The American Review Bookshop, was at 231 West 58th Street in New York City. It carried many journals, broadsheets and newsletters that supported nationalist and fascist causes in Europe and Asia.

In 1936, he married Dorothea Brande. A man of independent wealth, Collins published two literary journals, The Bookman (1927–1933) and the far-right American Review (1933–1937).

Collins was infatuated with the writings of prominent humanists of his day, including Paul Elmer More and Irving Babbitt. Politically, he moved from left-liberalism in the early 1920s and eventually away from More's and Babbitt's humanism to what he called fascism by the end of the decade. In The American Review, he sought to develop an American form of fascism and praised Italian dictator Benito Mussolini and German dictator Adolf Hitler in an article titled "Monarch as Alternative", which appeared in the first issue in 1933. In that essay, Collins attacked both capitalism and communism and heralded the "New Monarch," who would champion the common good over and against the machinations of capitalists and communists. His praise of Hitler was grounded in his belief that Hitler's rise to power that year heralded the end of the communist threat, as is illustrated by this excerpt:

One would gather from the fantastic lack of proportion of our press—not to say its gullibility and sensationalism—that the most important aspect of the German revolution was the hardships suffered by Jews under the new regime. Even if the absurd atrocity stories were all true, the fact would be almost negligible beside an event that shouts aloud in spite of the journalistic silence: the victory of Hitler signifies the end of the Communist threat, forever. Wherever Communism grows strong enough to make a Communist revolution a danger, it will be crushed by a Fascist revolution.

In a 1936 interview that he granted to Grace Lumpkin in the pro-communist periodical FIGHT against War and Fascism, Collins stated, "I am a fascist. I admire Hitler and Mussolini very much. They have done great things for their countries." When Lumpkin objected to Hitler's persecution of the Jews, Collins replied, "It is not persecution. The Jews make trouble. It is necessary to segregate them." Collins also called for the revival of a monarchy and feudalism in the United States.

The American Review ran articles by many leading literary critics of the day, including the Southern Agrarians, who, though hardly fascists, accepted a Northern publisher for their anti-modern essays. Several of them came to regret (and renounce) their relationship with Collins, however, after his political views became better known. One of them, Allen Tate, wrote a rebuttal of fascism for the liberal The New Republic. Nevertheless, Tate remained in contact with Collins and continued to publish in The American Review until its demise in 1937.

In addition to featuring essays by many critics of modernity, The American Review also became a vehicle for spreading ideas associated with English distributism, the supporters of which included G. K. Chesterton and Hilaire Belloc.

Collins and his wife, a spiritual medium, were actively involved with psychic phenomena during the 1930s. Their circle of friends included W.H. Salter, Theodore Besterman and Mrs. Henry Sidgwick, all of whom were affiliated with the Society for Psychical Research in London.

Collins is remembered primarily as a fascist editor and publisher who detested communism and counted many pre-War writers as his friends or colleagues. His essay "Monarch as Alternative" appears in Conservatism in America Since 1930, a collection of essays by conservative writers published by New York University Press in 2003.

A 2005 biography of Collins, And Then They Loved Him: Seward Collins & the Chimera of an American Fascism, argues that he was never a real "fascist." This book, which is based on Collins's actual papers and letters, as well as his FBI file, argues that Collins was in fact a distributist who inexplicably called agrarianism "fascism". The book concludes that Collins then became a kind of scapegoat after 1941 when many other members of the American social and intellectual elites were eager to distract attention from their own flirtations with fascism in the 1920s and 1930s. Yet his praise of Hitler and Mussolini testifies to his beliefs, at least during the 1930s.
