= The Bookman (New York City) =

American literary journal (1895–1933)

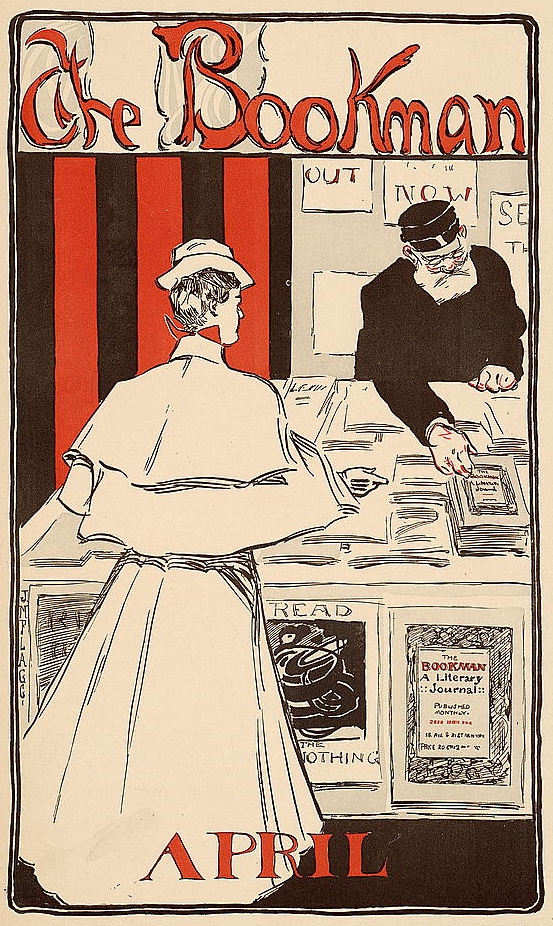
- James Montgomery Flagg poster for The Bookman (April 1896)
- Former editors: Harry Thurston Peck, Arthur Bartlett Maurice, G.G. Wyant, John C. Farrar, Burton Rascoe, Seward B. Collins
- Categories: Literary magazine
- Frequency: Monthly
- Founder: Frank Howard Dodd
- Founded: 1895
- Final issue: 1933
- Country: United States
- Based in: New York City
- Language: English
- ISSN: 2156-9932

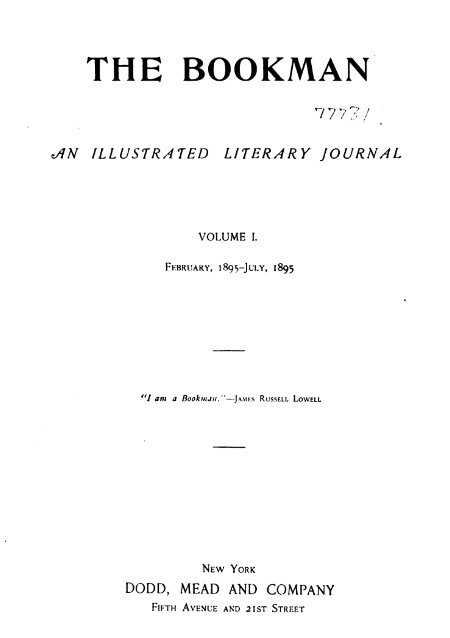
Title page of first volume of The Bookman (February–July 1895)

The Bookman was a literary journal established in 1895 by Dodd, Mead and Company

Frank H. Dodd, head of Dodd, Mead and Company, established The Bookman in 1895. Its first editor was Harry Thurston Peck, who worked on its staff from 1895 to 1906. With the journal's first issue in February 1895, Peck created America's first bestseller list. The lists in The Bookman ran from 1895 until 1918, and is the only comprehensive source of annual bestsellers in the United States from 1895 to 1912, when Publishers Weekly began publishing their own lists.

In the April 1895 edition, The Bookman's editors explained the need for an American version of the already established London Bookman: "The Bookman has been a great success since its first appearance in London in 1891, and it is believed that there is ample room and sufficient clientele among the great multitude of readers, for a literary journal of the same character in America. The American Edition will retain all of the popular features of the English Bookman, but it will be freshly edited and contain additional material of immediate importance to readers in the United States."

In 1918, the journal was bought by the George H. Doran Company and then sold in April 1927 to Burton Rascoe and Seward B. Collins. After Rascoe's departure in April 1928, Collins continued to edit and publish the magazine until it ceased publication in 1933.

It was edited by Arthur Bartlett Maurice (1873–1946) from 1899 to 1916; by G.G. Wyant from 1916 to 1918; and by John C. Farrar during the years it was owned by George H. Doran. Only under the brief editorship of Burton Rascoe from 1927 to 1928 did it abandon its conservative standards and political stance, publishing, for example, Upton Sinclair's novel Boston. Its last editor was Seward Collins, under whose editorship The Bookman carried articles conforming to his conservative views, influenced by Irving Babbitt, and promoted humanism and distributism. Collins himself was moving towards fascism during his years as editor. When The Bookman ceased publication in 1933, Collins launched The American Review.

== See also ==
- Books in the United States
- Publishers Weekly list of bestselling novels in the United States in the 1890s (from Bookman reports)
- Publishers Weekly list of bestselling novels in the United States in the 1900s (from Bookman reports)
- Publishers Weekly list of bestselling novels in the United States in the 1910s (from Bookman reports through 1912)
- The Bookman (London)
