= Wappenbury =

Village in Warwickshire, England

Coordinates: 52°19′17″N 1°26′48″W

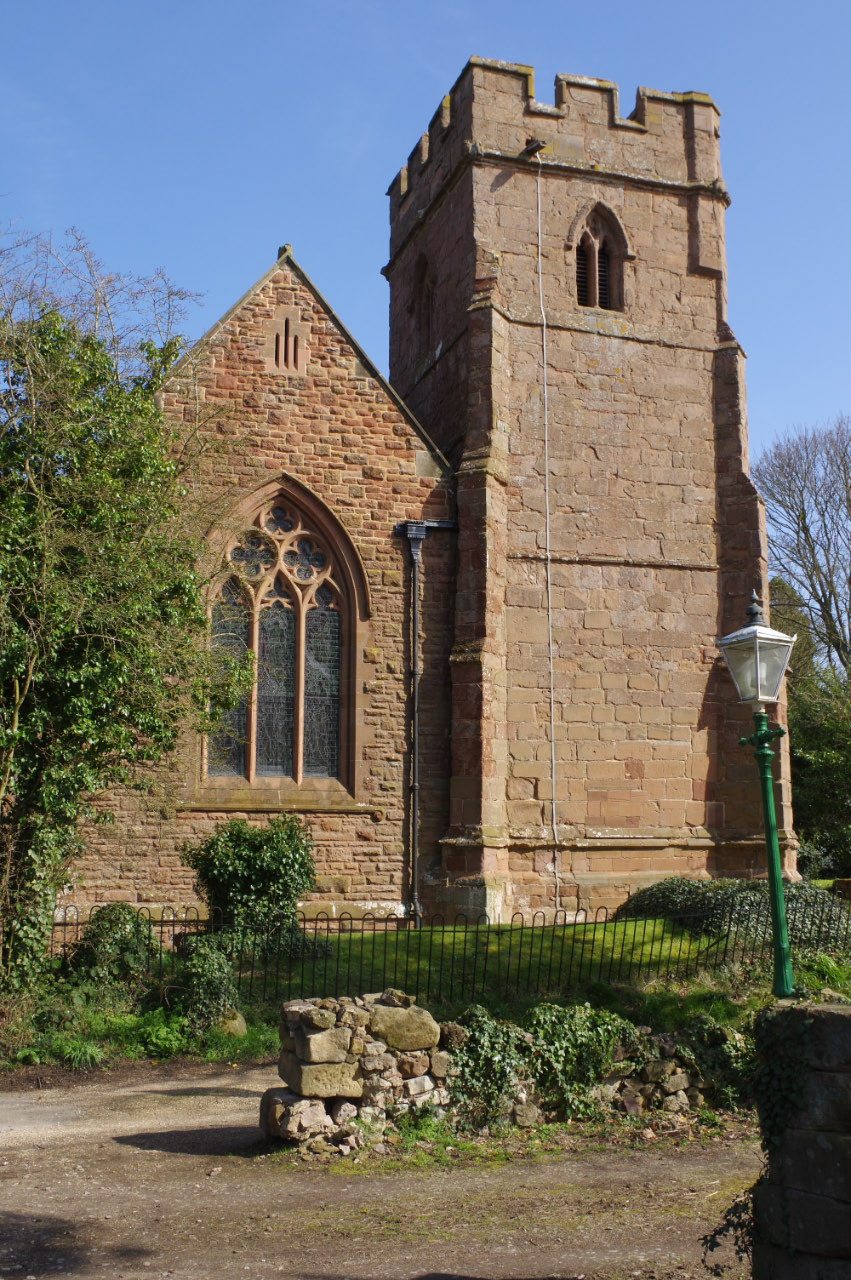
- St John the Baptist's Church, Wappenbury

- Location within Warwickshire
- OS grid reference: SP 378 693
- Shire county: Warwickshire
- Region: West Midlands
- Country: England
- Sovereign state: United Kingdom

Wappenbury is a small village and civil parish in the English county of Warwickshire, located on the north bank of the River Leam. The nearest town is Leamington Spa, about 5 miles (8 km) to the south west.

Wappenbury was mentioned in the Domesday Book of 1086. Its lord was Geoffrey of la Guerche, and it had a population of 31 households; resources included woodland. The woodland remains, in the north of the parish, where there are two nature reserves.

Much of the village, including the parish church of St John the Baptist, lies within the remains of an Iron Age hillfort.

== Churches ==
The Anglican Church of St John the Baptist, in the Diocese of Coventry. is a Grade II* listed building. It dates from the 13th century, and originally consisted of a nave and chancel. The west tower on the south side of the nave, and south aisle and porch, were added in the 14th century. The nave and south aisle were rebuilt in 1886, in 14th-century style, and a south porch and transept were added.

The church has three bells, dating from about 1580 to 1657; they cannot be swung, because of the fragility of the oak frame and fittings, which are of the same period.

In the churchyard is a 14th century cross, of which the base survives, on three octagonal steps. It is listed Grade II.

The Roman Catholic Church of St Anne was built in 1849, on a site given by Lord Clifford. It is in the Archdiocese of Birmingham. During the Second World War the priest was William Purcell Witcutt.

== Hillfort ==
Wappenbury Camp, a scheduled monument, is a univallate hillfort on the north bank of the River Leam. The area enclosed is about 8 hectares (20 acres), and it was probably built to defend a permanent settlement. The river, and a tributary, form natural scarp banks on the south and west sides of the hillfort. Elsewhere there are traces of a single rampart, and a ditch which has been mostly infilled. There was partial excavation in the 1950s, which showed that the northern rampart was originally about 3 metres (9.8 ft) high, with a ditch about 4 metres (13 ft) deep and 12 metres (39 ft) wide. Finds dated from the Iron Age to the early Roman period.

The remains of part of a medieval settlement are in the eastern part of the enclosure; the outlines of houses and lanes can be seen. St John the Baptist's Church, within the enclosure, survives from this period.

== Nature reserves ==
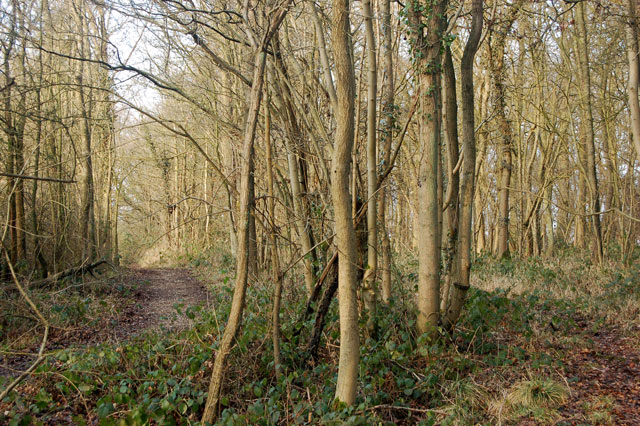
Old Nun Wood

Wappenbury Wood, a nature reserve of Warwickshire Wildlife Trust, lies north of the village. Woodland in the settlement was mention in the Domesday Book, and it was later known as Wappenbury Wood. It is a semi-natural ancient woodland of area 71 hectares (180 acres). By the end of the 15th century it was a source of fuel and building material. In the 1940s and 1950s it was nearly cleared of trees, and was left to regrow naturally.

Old Nun Wood, another part of the ancient woodland, is nearby. It is also a nature reserve of Warwickshire Wildlife Trust. Its area is 76 hectares (190 acres).
