= Dodd, Mead & Co. =

American publishing house

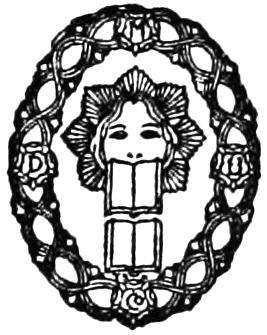
- Founded: 1839
- Founder: Moses Woodruff Dodd; John S. Taylor
- Defunct: 1989
- Country of origin: United States
- Headquarters location: New York City
- Key people: Frank Howard Dodd; Edward S. Mead
- Publication types: Books

Dodd, Mead and Company was one of the pioneer publishing houses of the United States, based in New York City. Under several names, the firm operated from 1839 until 1990.

== History ==
=== Origins ===
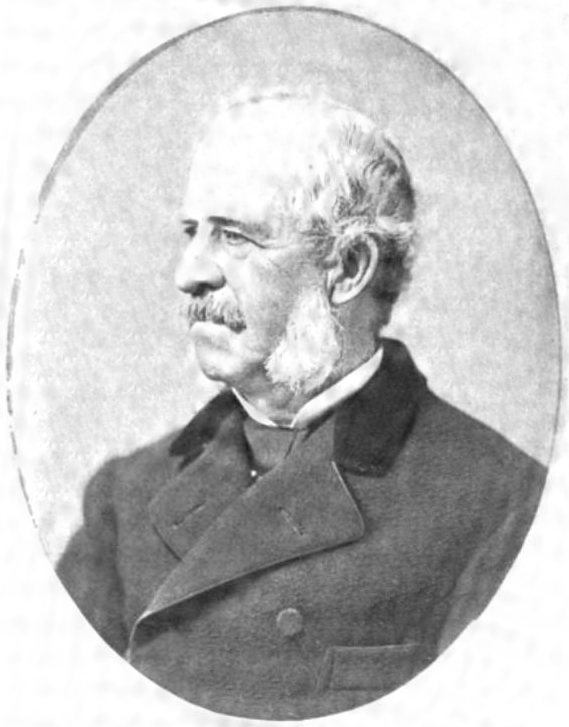
Moses Woodruff Dodd

In 1839, Moses Woodruff Dodd (1813–1899) and John S. Taylor, at that time a leading publisher in New York, formed the company of Taylor and Dodd as a publisher of religious books. In 1840, Dodd bought out Taylor and renamed the company as M.W. Dodd. Frank Howard Dodd (1844–1916) joined his father in business in 1859 and became increasingly involved in the publishing company's operation.

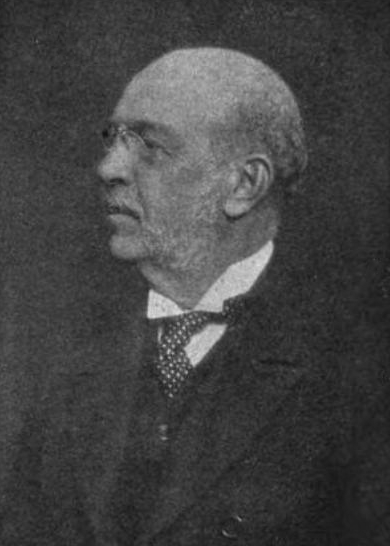
Frank Howard Dodd

With the retirement of founder Moses Dodd in 1870, control passed to his son Frank Howard Dodd, who joined in partnership with his cousin Edward S. Mead (1847–1894), and the company was reorganized as Dodd and Mead. In 1876, Bleecker Van Wagenen became a member of the firm and the name was changed to Dodd, Mead and Company.

=== Growth and prominence ===
The company was well known for the quality of its publications, including many books on American history and contemporary literature. As a bookseller, the firm was a dealer and leading authority in rare books.

As head of Dodd, Mead and Company, Frank Dodd established The Bookman in 1895, and The New International Encyclopedia in 1902. He was president of the American Publishers Association for a number of years. The firm built the Dodd Mead Building (1910) at the corner of Fourth Avenue and Thirtieth Street, and the 11-story building was heralded as creating a new trade center in New York City.

Dodd, Mead and Company published the work of new poets including Robert W. Service, Bliss Carman and Paul Laurence Dunbar.

When Frank Dodd died in 1916, the partnership was dissolved and the business was incorporated. Dodd's only son, Edward H. Dodd, succeeded him as president.

In 1922 Dodd, Mead and Company began a period of great expansion with the purchase of the American branch of John Lane Company, publisher of Anatole France, William John Locke and many prominent poets. Other authors included Aubrey Beardsley, Max Beerbohm, Rupert Brooke, G. K. Chesterton, Agatha Christie, Theodore Dreiser, and Stephen Leacock. In 1924 Dodd purchased Moffat, Yard & Co., adding books by William James, Sigmund Freud, and Carl Jung to their list. Dodd, Mead's New International Encyclopedia was sold in 1931 to Funk & Wagnalls. In 1934, Dodd, Mead acquired Duffield and Green, publisher of Elinor Glyn, Emma Gelders Sterne, and General Krasnov; and the Sears Publishing Company. Dodd, Mead acquired the complete works of George Bernard Shaw.

=== Acquisition and end ===
In December 1981, Dodd, Mead and Company became a subsidiary of Thomas Nelson Inc. One of the last family-owned publishers in the United States, it was purchased for $4 million. The company was sold again in 1986 to Gamut Publishing Company, a partnership founded by Jon B. Harden and Lynne A. Lumsden for the purpose of acquiring book publishing companies, for $4.7 million. To retire some of its debt, the owners of the 149-year-old publishing house sold its greatest assets – the U.S. rights to books by Agatha Christie and Max Brand — to the Putnam Berkley Group in 1988.

The business operations of Dodd, Mead and Company were suspended in March 1989 pending the outcome of arbitration with its fulfillment house, Metro Services, Inc. By the end of 1990 the company ceased publications.

== Authors ==
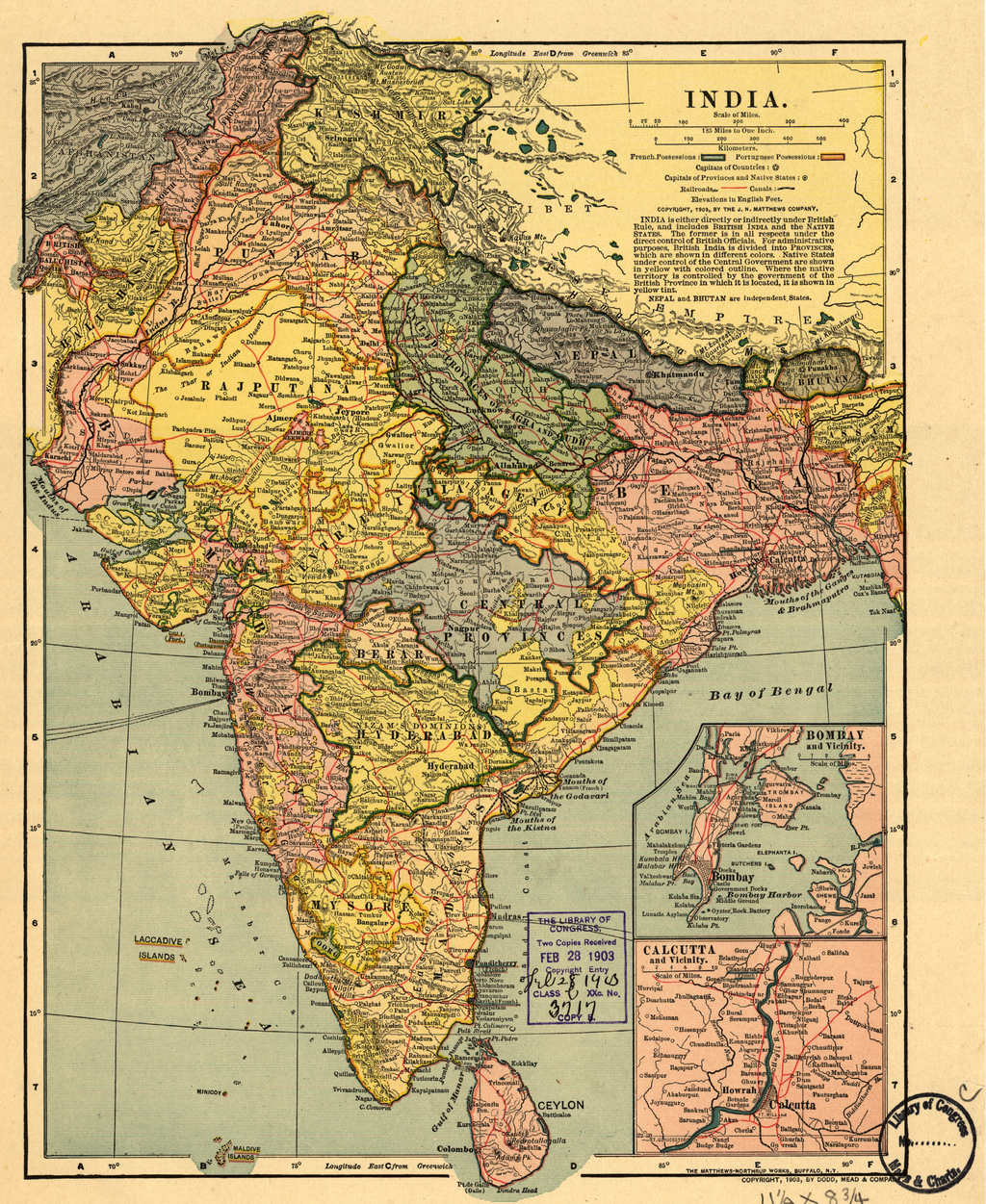
A map of the British Empire in India, printed by Dodd, Mead & Co., from 1903

Authors' names are followed by their known dates of association with Dodd, Mead and Company.

- Edward Abbey
- Amelia Edith Huddleston Barr (1885–1911)
- Caroline French Benton (1901, Gala-day luncheons)
- N. J. Berrill (1951–1966)
- Don Blanding (1928–1955)
- Max Brand
- Anna Alice Chapin (September 1912)
- Agatha Christie (1922–1976)
- Winston Churchill
- Paul Laurence Dunbar (1896–1914)
- Norman A. Fox (1911–1960)
- Ernest Holmes (1953 publication of The Science of Mind)
- W. W. Jacobs
- Charles Kingsley
- Ross Macdonald
- Addison Mizner (1932)
- Ruth Bryan Owen (1935–1942)
- John Cowper Powys (1920–1925)
- Arthur Ransome (1907, published his Bohemia in London)
- Vincent Scuro (1974–1986)
- Robert W. Service (1911–1954)
- Lee Thayer
- Anthony Trollope
- Bettina Riddle von Hutten

== Book series ==
- Ajax Series
- American Political Leaders
- Astor Library
- Dodd, Mead Career Books
- Ebony Library
- Great Illustrated Classics
- International Classics
- Modern American Writers
- Quill Library
- Red Badge Detective

== See also ==
- Books in the United States
