= Ownership society =

Slogan

Ownership society is a slogan for a model of society promoted by former United States president George W. Bush. It takes as lead values personal responsibility, economic liberty, and the owning of property. The ownership society discussed by Bush also extends to certain proposals of specific models of health care and social security.

== History ==
The term appears to have been used originally by President Bush (for example in a speech February 20, 2003 in Kennesaw, Georgia) as a phrase to rally support for his tax-cut proposals. From 2004 Bush supporters described the ownership society in much broader and more ambitious terms, including specific policy proposals concerning home ownership, medicine, education and savings.

The idea that the welfare of individuals is directly related to their ability to control their own lives and wealth, rather than relying on government transfer payments, is a longstanding one, particularly in British conservatism.

In a modern form its implementation was developed as a main plank of Thatcherism, and is traced back to David Howell, before 1970, with help from the phrase-maker Peter Drucker. The phrase commonly used at the time was a property-owning democracy.

In political practice under Margaret Thatcher's administration, it was implemented by measures such as the sale at affordable prices of public housing to tenants (right to buy program), and privatization.

== Ownership and control ==
As formulated by the Cato Institute (see original quote and external link below), the goals are that

- patients have control of [decisions on] their personal health care,
- parents control [i.e. have power over] their children's education, and
- workers control [i.e. have some responsibility for the investment of, or explicit property rights in] their retirement savings.

Here the comments in brackets are an interpretation or paraphrase, consistent with a generalised idea of ownership. The conceptual link here is by means of the idea that private property, the most familiar and everyday form of ownership, is being extended. Control is closely associated with ownership in that sense.

This Cato Institute formulation is not, however, in terms of positive policies. It is more accurately a definition of ownership by taking the state out of the loop. So, for example, in health care ownership is not being defined just on the basis of informed consent.

There is no real originality, politically speaking, in the connection made between individual ownership of property and political stake-holding. This was an idea discussed in Europe and America in the eighteenth century. (For example, that the franchise should only be for property holders.)

The novelty of the Cato Institute formulation would lie in the extrapolation. In the case of savings, for example, the extension would be an assertion of property rights in money held in savings or collected tax revenues.

The first desiderata was part of John McCain's campaign platform as the 2008 Republican presidential nominee. McCain's website says, "John McCain believes [that] the key to health care reform is to restore control to the patients themselves."

== Political consequences and unexpected consequences ==
Consistently with the basic tenet, proponents of an ownership society usually support inherited wealth, and oppose inheritance taxes and wealth taxes. They are also likely to favour a pattern of property ownership based on the purchase, rather than rental, of accommodation.

The consequences for health and education are heavily dependent on details of implementation. For example, ownership in one's child's education, for a parent, might be in the form of an education voucher, a vote in the running of a school, influence on the school curriculum, or a generalised 'right' to have a child educated in line with one's own values.

One example from the UK of an unexpected or unintended consequence of government policy favouring direct share ownership, through some oversubscribed privatisation issues, was the holding of small parcels of shares by individuals numbered in millions. This broad-based ownership created an administrative overhead, for example in relation to every shareholder vote.

== Quotations ==
The really big money in America comes not from working at all but from owning, which requires no expenditure of effort, either physical or mental. In short, working hard is not in and of itself directly related to the amount of income and wealth that individuals have. – The Meritocracy Myth by Stephen J. McNamee and Robert K. Miller, Jr. University of North Carolina at Wilmington.

We Conservatives have always passed our values from generation to generation. I believe that personal prosperity should follow the same course. I want to see wealth cascading down the generations. We do not see each generation starting out anew, with the past cut off and the future ignored. – John Major conference speech, 1991.

...if you own something, you have a vital stake in the future of our country. The more ownership there is in America, the more vitality there is in America, and the more people have a vital stake in the future of this country. – President George W. Bush, June 17, 2004.

We're creating... an ownership society in this country, where more Americans than ever will be able to open up their door where they live and say, welcome to my house, welcome to my piece of property. – President George W. Bush, October 2004.

Individuals are empowered by freeing them from dependence on government handouts and making them owners instead, in control of their own lives and destinies. In the ownership society, patients control their own health care, parents control their own children's education, and workers control their retirement savings. – Cato Institute.

Many people don't have the time, inclination, or expertise necessary to take full responsibility for their own well-being in areas that are so complex as assuring they have sufficient income for retirement or choosing a health plan appropriate for their circumstances. – Robert Reischauer, president of the Urban Institute, a Washington think tank.

...the key to health care reform is to restore control to the patients themselves. – John McCain's campaign website, 2008.

George Bush called this the ownership society, but what he really meant was 'you're-on-your-own' society. – Barack Obama, 2008.

== See also ==
- Property-owning democracy
