= FIGHT Against War and Fascism =

FIGHT Against War and Fascism was an anti-fascist monthly broadsheet published in the United States by the American League Against War and Fascism from November 1933 until July 1939. It was headquartered in New York City.

It was sponsored by socialists and communists. It apparently had Albert Einstein on its editorial committee.

Perhaps the most famous interview conducted by the paper occurred in 1936, when Grace Lumpkin interviewed the New York publisher and editor Seward Collins, whose literary journal The American Review published the work of T. S. Eliot and other notable writers. In that interview, Collins came out as a fascist and supporter of Benito Mussolini and Adolf Hitler and a harsh critic of European Jews. The fallout from the interview was immediate and The American Review ceased publication the following year.
