= Property-owning democracy =

Political economy system where state intervention allows fair possession distribution

- A system of social organisation. Part of John Rawls' five structures of social institutions.
- Caused by: The idea of a property-owning democracy derived from Western political thought.
- Goals: Enabling a fairer distribution of property and political power.
- Methods: This system is implemented through policy reform.

A property-owning democracy is a social system whereby state institutions enable a fair distribution of productive property across the populace generally, rather than allowing monopolies to form and dominate. This intends to ensure that all individuals have a fair and equal opportunity to participate in the market. It is thought that this system is necessary to break the constraints of welfare-state capitalism and manifest a cooperation of citizens, who each hold equal political power and potential for economic advancement. This form of societal organisation was popularised by John Rawls, as the most effective structure amongst four other competing systems: laissez-faire capitalism, welfare-state capitalism, state socialism with a command economy, and liberal socialism. The idea of a property-owning democracy is somewhat foreign in Western political philosophy, despite issues of political disenfranchisement emerging concurrent to the accelerating inequality of wealth and capital ownership over the past four decades.

== Etymology and history ==
Although popularised by Rawls, the term 'property-owning democracy' had been used in different ways before him. Coined by British MP Noel Skelton in 1920, the concept emphasized the terms 'property-owning' and 'democracy' as a conservative response to left-leaning ideas of liberalism and socialism. At this stage, the term represented the necessity of protecting property rights from democratic organisation.

British conservatives had one meaning of the term 'property-owning democracy' before it was reconceptualized by British economist James Meade. He co-opted it to argue that re-distributive policies are required to achieve the model society proposed by Skelton and his followers. The concept has since been used to describe an ideal society in which property-ownership is broadly distributed throughout the population.

Rawls borrowed the term from Meade in A Theory of Justice (1971), which caused it to spread widely.

== Description and theoretical foundations ==
Rawls described 'property-owning democracy' as a social system that aspires to distribute the ownership of property widely throughout the populace, so that citizens may co-operate under equal and free relationships. This ideal is based on the premise that individuals must possess productive resources in order to enable fair societal participation and equal political influence. Whereas conventional liberalist thought endows each individual with the autonomy to make rational self-maximising decisions in their own interests, the concept of a property-owning democracy would contrarily argue that citizens cannot freely make political decisions due to the undue influence of wealth inequality. This is identified by Rawls in his Justice as Fairness: A Restatement: "Inequalities in the ownership and control of wealth, income, and property can reduce the fair value of basic liberties."

This system does not condemn the use of markets to determine demand and fair prices; however, it asserts that private ownership of productive means may corrupt a fair equality of opportunity. As levels of wealth inequality increase, so does the political influence of affluent classes. Similarly, Rawls contrasts property-owning democracy against socialist forms of governance, which are thought to dismiss basic individual liberties in a manner that is inconsistent with democratic values. Although depicted in opposition to these systems, property-owning democracy is accepted by both conservative and liberal theorists.

=== Fundamental components ===
Property-owning democracies promote the power of institutions to implement policies and taxes that regulate the inheritance and acquisition of private property, in order to disperse wealth and capital throughout the population. Concentrated ownership of the means of production in a near monopoly creates a situation in which labour must depend upon their employers for wages in a relationship of unequal bargaining power, causing wealth to increasingly accumulate at the top quintile of society. It is then problematic that the candidates elected for public office are generally those supported by economic elites, through the provision of individual and corporate donations that are required to run successful political campaigns. Subsequently, politicians have been found to produce legislation and policy that favours the interests of donors on whom they depend to be elected, over those of the general public. This is exacerbated by the influence of lobbying, funded interest groups and the concentration of media ownership. Such practices are illustrated in the Princeton University study into wealth's corruption of politics, which found: "The preferences of the average American appear to have only a minuscule, near-zero, statistically non-significant impact upon public policy."

From this perspective, the concentrated ownership of property acts to diminish democratic values. The notion of property-owning democracy acts to reverse this corruption of political power by redistributing productive property across a greater proportion of society, thereby facilitating a more equal distribution of political power. A satisfactorily implemented property-owning democracy, then, would contain institutional mechanisms that seek to diffuse capital, wealth and productive resources. This would be accompanied by a range of social development schemes that ensure all individuals are equally capable of achieving economic success and political influence. It would include the development of human capital through publicly funded education, free healthcare, an adequate social minimum and policies that seek to ensure the equal participation of individuals within the political society.It may also include something akin to a universal right to private property.

=== Comparison to welfare-state capitalism ===
A property-owning democracy differs to a system of welfare-state capitalism, in which the state guarantees a social minimum but does not significantly intervene in the free market. Welfare-state capitalism is based upon a redistribution of income through means tested social welfare, as opposed to a reallocation of productive resources under property-owning democracies. Proponents of property-owning democracy would claim that this form of social structure produces socioeconomic classes, at the base of which sits a demoralised grouping who are dependent upon state-sanctioned welfare. Although welfare systems demonstrate some concern for equality of opportunity, it fails to substantially deliver upon the ideals of equal cooperation because it permits the concentration of wealth and productive resources within an elite minority. The provision of a social minimum does not address the consequences that transpire when wealth, political influence and power coincide. Economists, political theorists and sociologists therefore posit that welfare-state capitalism does not appropriately address the influence of wealth on political decision making, as it reinforces the structural constraints that fail to ensure economic opportunity for the worst-off in society.

=== Perspective of social and political justice ===
Rawls promotes the property-owning democracy above four alternative institutions: laissez-faire capitalism, welfare-state capitalism, state socialism with a command economy and liberal socialism. This ranking is determined in accordance with Rawls' two principles of justice prescribed in A Theory of Justice (1971), which has been widely accepted within political discourse. The first principle mandates that each person is entitled to equal basic liberties, whilst the second principle requires that inequalities exist only where all individuals had equal opportunities and where it is arranged to be of "greatest benefit to the least advantaged".

These principles are thought to be best fulfilled by a system of property-owning democracy. Equal basic liberties are improved and ensured, as a dispersal of wealth, income and property allows all individuals a relatively comparable level of political and economic power. The fair equality of opportunity acts to assure that wealth and property ownership cannot improve and manipulate an individual's place in the social order, particularly in relation to their access to education, healthcare, employment and housing. Finally, the redistribution of wealth and productive property acts to satisfy the 'difference principle' by guaranteeing an equal distribution of social primary goods, thereby best aiding those who are most disadvantaged. It is within this context that property-owning democracy derives its esteem.

== Criticism ==
Property-owning democracy has been criticised broadly by liberal democratic advocates, who argue that democracy is achieved when each individual has an equal vote in the election of representative candidates. It is therefore just for a state to maintain its current politico-economic system, as this is the social structure for which the populace has voted. If the public desired the values and policies that comprise property-owning democracy, they could vote for candidates who promised to implement these institutions.

Additionally, if the idea that ownership of productive property determines one's political influence is pursued to its logical conclusion, a truly equal society would mandate policies that extend beyond those redistributive mechanisms outlined by Rawls to allow a fully equal distribution of property throughout society. It is therefore criticised for diminishing the liberty to pursue economic value and acquire property, conforming with the premise of state socialism which is disqualified under Rawls' own internal logic. The universal value of this social system is also limited by its particular bias toward Western ways of thinking, whilst ignoring the pluralistic cultural, religious, philosophical and economic differences worldwide. It is therefore inappropriate to assert the value of this morally charged political structure over all political communities.

=== Welfare-state capitalism ===
Proponents of welfare-state capitalism critique property-owning democracy for too liberally dismissing the role of individual differences of skill, intelligence and physiological qualities to produce divergent outcomes. This perspective reasons that individuals are incentivised by profit to make decisions in terms of human capital development, employment difficulty and time commitment, saving and spending decisions, as well as investment in entrepreneurial endeavours. Where individuals have made differing decisions to their benefit, it cannot be considered just to redistribute the profit, wealth and property attained through their autonomous decision-making. It is more appropriate, from the perspective of welfare-state capitalism, to provide a social minimum whereby those individuals who struggle to convert their capabilities into economic benefits are assured a basic standard of living, without mandating that they be gifted equal ownership over productive property which they have not earned.

=== Laissez-faire ===
Laissez-faire perspectives condemn the tendency of property-owning democracy to neglect the importance of incentive to ensure a productive economy. Insofar as the production of wealth is recognised as the result of human activity, it follows that individuals with high levels of wealth and property ownership are the proper and just owners of those goods. It cannot follow that justice is served by seizing those benefits from their rightful owners. Thus, the goal of property-owning democracy to redistribute this wealth and productive property broadly throughout the population acts to delimit the market incentive to acquire those goods. It is then assumed that laissez-faire capitalism would more appropriately maximise the position of the worst off, as incentivising those with the most marketable talents to excel will propel society to the benefit of all.

It additionally criticises the capacity of property-owning democracies to better ensure the liberties and equal opportunities of all individuals, as a laissez-faire market naturally facilitates these outcomes via each individual pursuing their own interests. For instance, individuals of differing arbitrary distinctions, such as race, religion or gender, are equally likely to be employed by a corporation who is incentivised by the free market to hire the individual who maximises returns. Similar to welfare-state capitalism, laissez-faire perspectives also deny that wealth allows individuals to virtually purchase votes in the political realm. Current democratic political systems do not structurally prohibit voters from electing candidates who would promise and legislate a more equitable distribution of property.

=== State socialism ===
Advocates of state socialism criticise property-owning democracy for its soft principles on property redistribution, which fail to effectively enable an equal ownership over the means of production. It posits that the operation of a free market system cannot be decoupled from capitalism, and that the policies prescribed property-owning democracy structures fail to achieve the ideals of its own ideology, as capital will perpetually accumulate within fewer and fewer hands under a market system.

=== Liberal socialism ===
Although Rawls recognised that liberal socialism could fulfil the two principles of justice, it was discarded as the ideal system of social organisation due to its lack of feasibility in terms of implementation and public acceptance. This system therefore opposes property-owning democracy for its systems' lack of practicality. While property-owning democracy asserts the value of redistributing productive property, liberal socialism claims to achieve the end goal of equal opportunity and political influence through means that are less coercive. By implementing a combination of both capitalist structures and limited forms of social ownership of capital, in conjunction with socialised systems of healthcare, education and security, liberal socialism claims to more fairly achieve the goals of property-owning democracies as it accounts for individual autonomy.

== See also ==
- Ownership society, a political slogan overlapping with the principles of a property-owning democracy.
