= William Purcell Witcutt =

British folklorist (1908–1972)

William Purcell Witcutt (1908–1972) was a notable British religious minister, folklorist and author. He was born into the Anglican church, converted to Catholicism in the early 1930s, and returned to the Church of England in the mid-1950s. He is the author of "Blake: a Psychological Study."

== Biography ==
Witcutt was the son of a Staffordshire merchant tailor. He studied law at the University of Birmingham, England, and around 1928 his interest in G. K. Chesterton's anti-industrial theory of Distributism led him to become a prominent contributor to Chesterton's G. K.'s Weekly publication, where he was a strong critic of the theory of the Leisure State. His interest in Distributism continued into the 1930s, as evidence by his article "William Morris: distributist" in American Review in 1934 (II, pp. 311–15), and he appears to have been a Distributist at least until around the outbreak of war in 1939. His 46-page pamphlet The Dying Lands: a fifty years' plan for the distressed areas appeared under the imprint of the Distributist League of London in 1937, and offered a radical agrarian solution to the problem of mass unemployment.

This line of thought eventually led him into the Roman Catholic church, and to convert to Catholicism in the early 1930s. He obtained a dispensation to void the usual two-year probationary period, immediately undertaking a seven-year seminary training at New Oscott to become a Catholic priest. On graduating he was sent to serve in a slum parish in nearby Birmingham. He told in his spiritual autobiography, Return to Reality (1954), of how his lecture on The Reformation and the corrupt nature of many medieval Catholic priests inadvertently led to his being 'banished' to serve in the most remote parts of the diocese. He became a parish priest in Leek, north Staffordshire, and, during the Second World War he also served at St. Anne's, Wappenbury, Warwickshire.

He eventually converted back to the Church of England. His re-conversion merited an article in Time magazine ("To Rome & Return", 4 July 1955). He became a high-church Anglican curate in the working class area of East Ham, London, and later on served as the Rector of Foulness Island a short while after it had been badly affected by the great North Sea Flood.

== Works ==
During the war Witcutt wrote up and published his notes on folklore in the fringe areas of the West Midlands, including:

- "Notes on Staffordshire Folklore" (Folklore, Vol. 53, No. 2, June 1942, pp. 126–27);
- "The Horsley Legend" (Folklore, Vol. 55, No. 2, June 1944, pp. 73–75);
- "The Black Dog" (Folklore, Vol. 53, 1942, p. 167)

During the war he encountered Ukrainian refugees, and this resulted in the scholarly article "Mortuary Beliefs and Practices Among the Galician Ukrainians", published in Folklore (Vol.57. No. 2., June 1946).

Witcutt undertook one of the first applications of the theories of Jung to visionary English literature. His book Blake, a psychological study examined the works of William Blake via the theory of Jungian archetypes. Witcutt corresponded with Jung on the matter.

Other works by Witcutt include:

- Catholic Thought And Modern Psychology;
- Child in Paradise (a study of the role of fantasy in childhood);
- an early critical study of D. H. Lawrence, The Cult of D.H. Lawrence.
