= Outlets of Maui =

Destroyed mall in Lahaina, Hawaii, U.S.

The Outlets of Maui
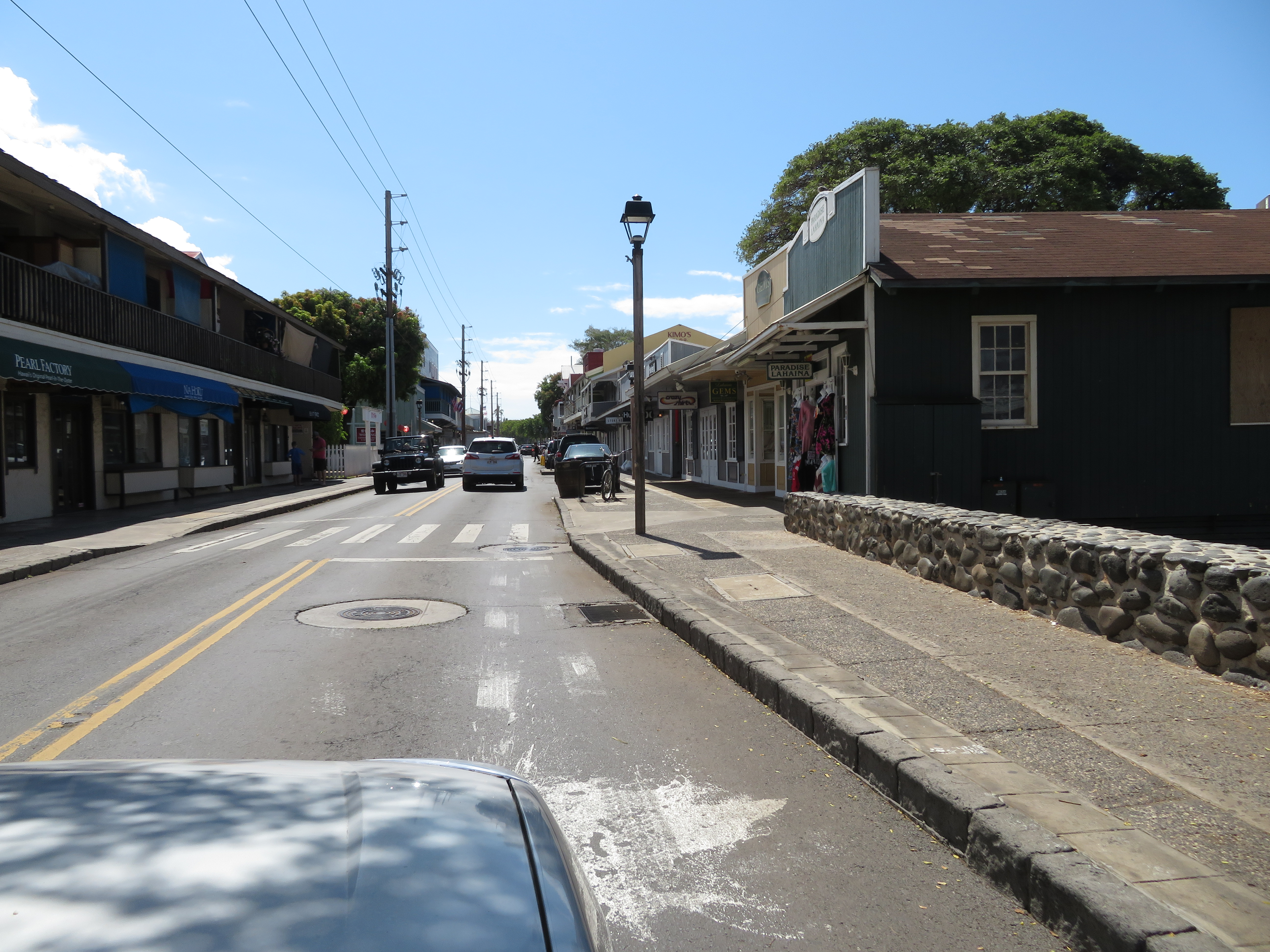
- Front Street (March 2021)
- Location: Lahaina, Hawaii, U.S.
- Coordinates: 20°52′40″N 156°40′48″W
- Address: 900 Front Street, 96761
- Opened: 1990; 36 years ago (as Lahaina Center); November 21, 2013; 12 years ago (soft opening); December 6, 2013; 12 years ago (grand opening)
- Renovated: April–December 2013
- Closed: August 8, 2023; 3 years ago
- Demolished: March 2024 (heavily damaged on August 8, 2023)
- Previous names: Lahaina Center (1990–2013)
- Developer: 3900 Corporation
- Owner: M&J Wilkow; Bixby Bridge Capital
- Architect: Clifford Planning & Architecture LLC; Eight Inc.
- Num. of stores: Before wildfire: approx. 30–35 (as Lahaina Center); approx. 35–40 (as Outlets of Maui); After wildfire: None
- Num. of anchor tenants: Before wildfire: 1 (Hilo Hattie); After wildfire: None
- Floor area: 146,135 square feet (14,000 m^{2})
- Floors: 1–2
- Parking: Open surface lot; Parking garage
- Website: outletsofmaui.com at the Wayback Machine (May 2023 archive)
- Building details
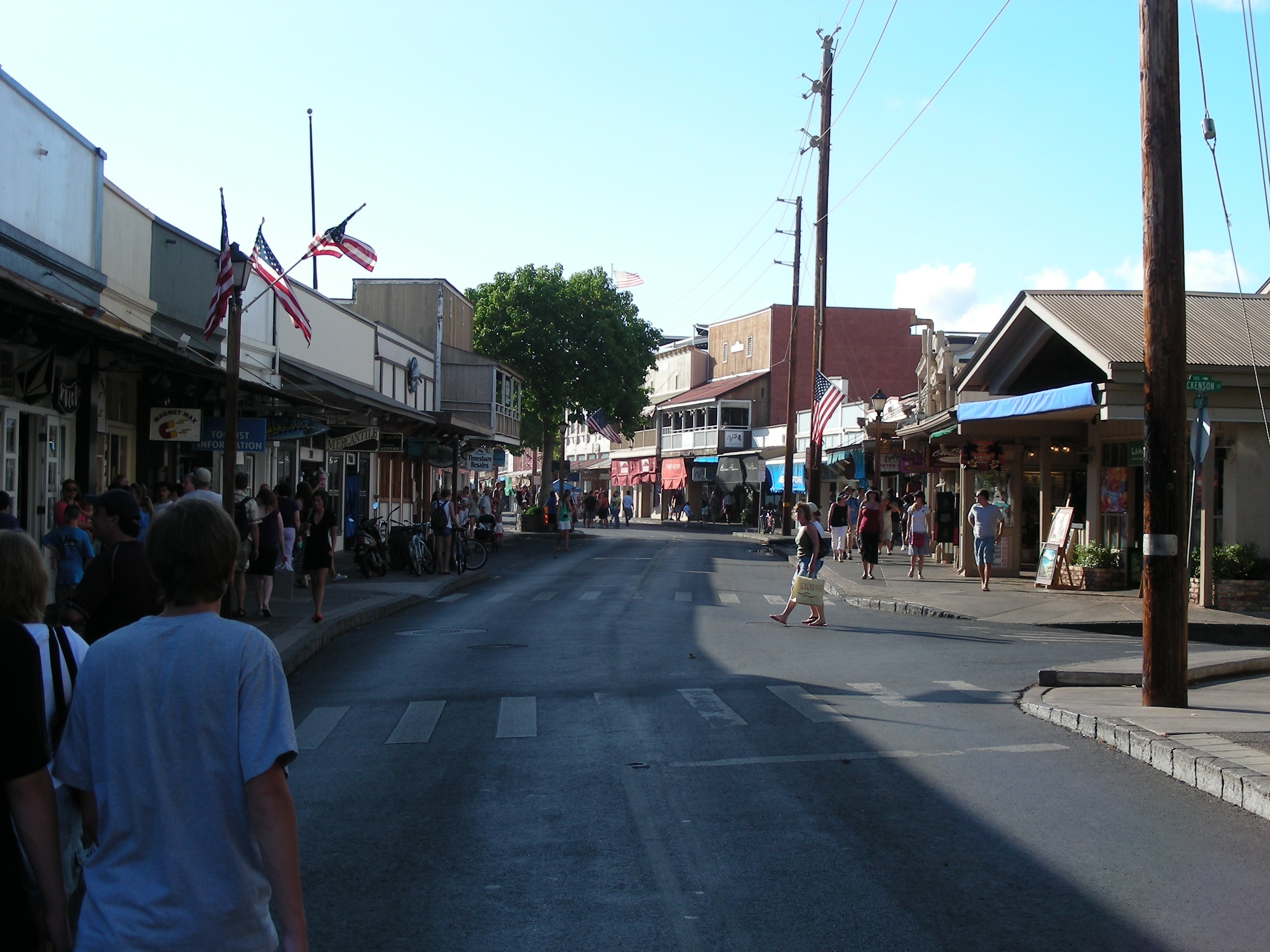
- Lahaina Center (July 2009)

General information
- Status: Destroyed

Design and construction
- Main contractor: Honolulu Builders LLC; Griffith Construction Consultants Inc.

Renovating team
- Renovating firm: Luzzatto Company; Honu Group

The Outlets of Maui was an open-air shopping center located on historic Front Street in Lahaina, Maui, Hawaii, United States. It first opened to the public in November 2013 on the former site of the Lahaina Center, making it the island's only upscale outlet retail center.

The mall's architecture was designed to match the historic aesthetics of the town, featuring wood and a summer appearance. Legacy tenants included Hard Rock Cafe, and Bubba Gump Shrimp Co., which opened in the 1990s, while later ones included Gap Outlet and Banana Republic, which opened in the 2010s. The complex was completely destroyed by the 2023 Hawaii wildfires, and was later demolished in March 2024 during the phased cleanup process. As of July 2026, an $8 million marketplace was announced to be built on the former site.

== History ==
=== 1990–2000: Opening and decline ===
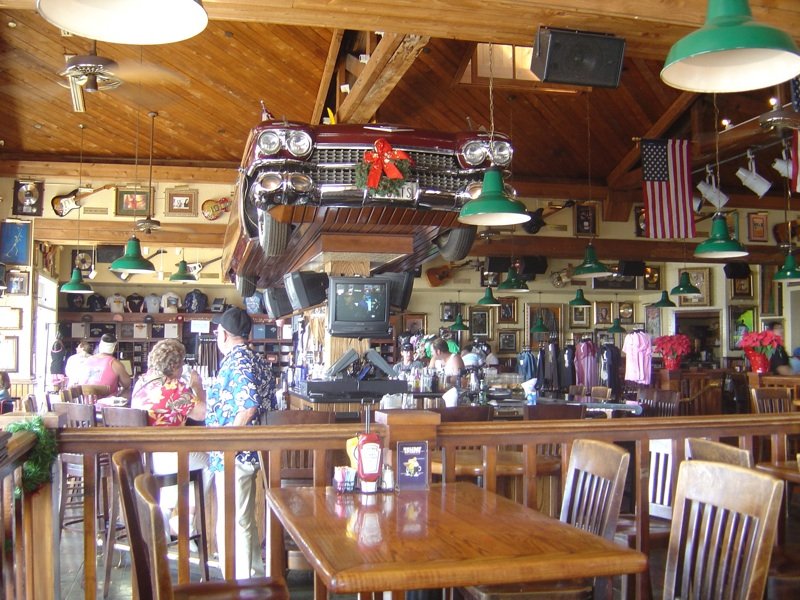
Hard Rock Cafe (December 2005)

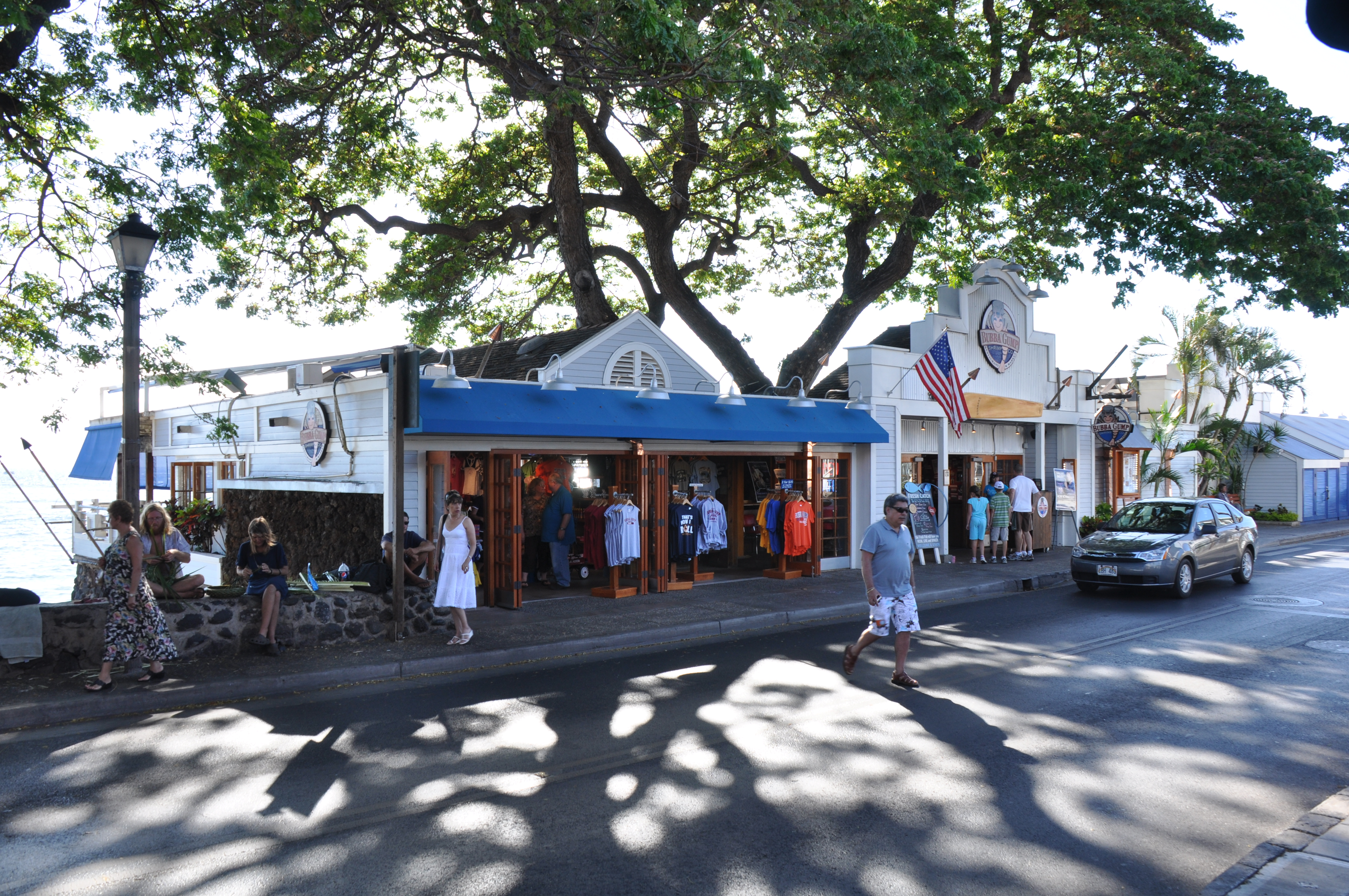
Bubba Gump Shrimp Co. (August 2010)

Lahaina Grill opened on February 14, 1990. In the spring of 1990, Pomare Properties and Sofos Realty Corporation began a major leasing and publicized expansion plan for the Lahaina Center, which was established by 3900 Corporation. 20th Century Masters, an art gallery, opened at the center in May of that year, followed by 88 Cent Video Store in June and Hard Rock Cafe on July 23.

On June 27, 1990, Pancakes of Hawaii, which already had locations in Honolulu, Oahu, signed a lease with the center's management agencies, with salesman Lee Carter allegedly assuring the company that the mall would reach 80-85% occupancy and massive foot traffic. The restaurant ultimately had its grand opening celebration in September 1991; however, it closed two months later as Lahaina Center suffered an occupancy rate of under 35%. Pancakes of Hawaii later filed a lawsuit against Pomare, Carter, and Sofos Realty for breach of contract, alleging that they lied about the mall's actual health and projected occupancy to force them into signing.

The lawsuit was settled in mid-1995, where mall management argued that the leasing agreement was final, and any promises made before such did not count. However, Pancakes of Hawaii appealed, and on July 31, 1997, the Hawaii Intermediate Court of Appeals ruled that if a leasing agent knowingly lies to a tenant to get them to sign a lease, the tenant has the right to use those verbal lies as evidence in court, determining there were genuine issues of material fact regarding whether the brokers intentionally misled the restaurant about the dead mall.

Bubba Gump Shrimp Co. announced on November 11, 1997 that they would open at 889 Front Street—the site of the former Lahaina Broiler–on November 21 of that year. Ruth's Chris Steak House opened at the center in 1998. After David Paul's Lahaina Grill's original location was sold, the restaurant reopened as David Paul's Island Grill in 2000, featuring 8,000 sq ft (740 m^{2}).

=== 2013 redevelopment as Outlets of Maui ===
The investment and development firm Luzzatto Company (TLC) acquired the ground lease interest in the 145,000 square feet (13,500 m^{2}) shopping center in 2012; on September 1 of that year, David Paul's Island Grill closed its doors due to rising operational costs by 25% over the past three years of operation and affecting 25 jobs.

By October 2012, Lahaina Center was 30 to 40% leased, so the developers announced a $28 million redevelopment effort to convert the facility into an outlet mall known as The Outlets of Maui, renovating ten buildings on 11 acres (4.5 ha) of land, to compete with Simon Property Group's Waikele Premium Outlets in Western Oahu with a similar tenant mix, which was, at the time, the only outlet destination Hawaii had, and the proposal would preserve the shopping center's historic aesthetics and retain existing anchors. The Honu Group spearheaded the ground-level redevelopment, securing a critical $19.5 million construction loan in June 2013 to fund the $28 million layout transformation.

Groundbreaking on the conversion began in April 2013, with Honolulu Builders LLC and Griffith Construction Consultants Inc. as the general contractors and construction managers respectively. Eight Inc. served as the lead architect, and Clifford Planning & Architecture LLC served as the architect of record. In October of that year, the 148,000-square-foot (13,700 m^{2}) project was nearing completion, with a soft opening date of November 21 to support Thanksgiving celebrations, followed by a grand opening date of December 6 in time for the holidays, was announced by Luzzato Co.'s local affiliate, The Outlets of Maui 1 LLC.

The Outlets of Maui had its grand opening celebration on December 6, 2013, with original tenants Gap Outlet, Tommy Bahama, Banana Republic Factory Store, Calvin Klein, Michael Kors, Brooks Brothers, Coach, and Tommy Hilfiger. Ono Gelato & Espresso Bar, Pi Artisan Pizzeria, Cold Stone Creamery, Hard Rock Cafe, and Ruth's Chris Steak House concluded with a local buffet in the evening, and the appearances of George Kahumoku Jr., Christina Souza, and Jimmy Borges consolidating with performances from local bands. Hawaiian Island Creations (HIC) opened on February 14, 2014, launching its 14th island location. Following the opening, Luzzatto Co. sold its interests.

=== 2014–2019: After opening ===
In May 2014, development partners Watt Companies and Watts Advisors announced that the initial $28 million renovation had brought the mall to a 91% lease capacity, unveiling an official plan to expand the complex by an additional 50,000 square feet (4,600 m^{2}) by the end of 2015. To fuel the traffic required for the expanding retail footprint, the center launched the West Maui Shopping Shuttle on May 19, which ran hourly daily from 10 a.m. HAST to 10 p.m. HAST, linking the newly expanded outlet center directly to seven major resort properties across Kāʻanapali and the Lahaina Harbor. On August 22, 2014, Skechers Factory Outlet opened at the Outlets of Maui.

Hard Rock Cafe Maui celebrated its 25th anniversary in July 2015 by offering 25-cent cheeseburger sliders, and, as its commitment to the brand's motto, "Save the Planet", they partnered with the Landfill Diversion Project to create the new sand bar out of eight tons of sand and recycled materials. Maui County Mayor Alan Arakawa emphasized that HRC spent 25 years of local community service, such as free Thanksgiving meals for the homeless and raising funds for local nonprofits, including Feed My Sheep and the Maui Humane Society. However, the restaurant closed permanently on December 31, 2016, with Hard Rock International not publicly providing a reason for it.

By 2018, JLL of Chicago, Illinois, became the new property manager, while CoastWood Capital Group of San Francisco, California took over ownership. Entertainment venue Island Bowling would debut on March 1 of that year. and Le Creuset would follow in June. A 3,250 sq ft (302 m^{2}) Kate Spade would open on October 12, 2018, with management also revealing that Waikiki Brewing Company would come to the center.

On September 24, 2019, Hilo Hattie celebrated the grand opening of its new 5,715 sq ft (530.9 m^{2}) flagship within the mall, 25% larger than its former space.

=== 2020–2023: Final years ===
As a result of the COVID-19 pandemic, Ruth's Chris Steak House permanently shut down in early July 2020. Waikiki Brewing Company had a partially operational opening in late July of that year for similar reasons, followed by full operational status in December.

Tommy Bahama expanded its presence in the Outlets of Maui by opening an 8,900 sq ft (830 m^{2}) Marlin Bar & Store inside the former Hard Rock Cafe space on January 11, 2021, and Bubba Gump closed its doors on April 15, 2021.

In August 2021, the mall was sold to M&J Wilkow and Bixby Bridge Capital.

=== August 2023 Hawaii wildfires and redevelopment status ===
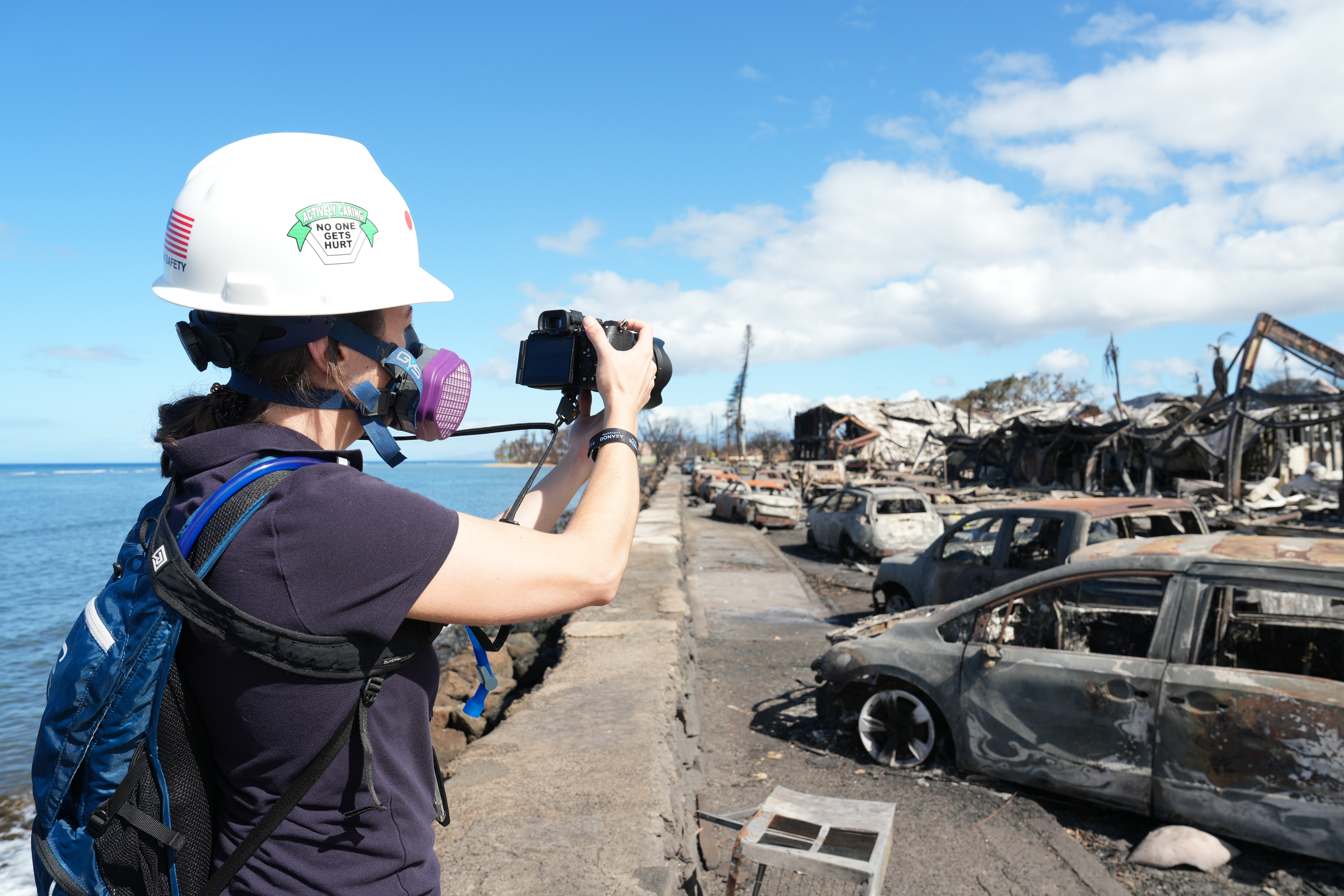
Front Street on August 15, 2023, one week after the disaster, as taken by FEMA

On August 8, 2023 at 2:55 p.m. HAST, the initial brush fire caused by Hurricane Dora winds knocking out power and utility poles suffered a catastrophic afternoon flare-up near its original ignition point, caused by 60–80 mph gale-force winds.

By 3:30 p.m. HAST, the fire jumped containment lines and rapidly tore down the slope toward the ocean, causing massive traffic bottlenecks forming instantly on Front Street. Escape paths were severely hindered because fallen utility poles and live electrical lines blocked the main highway exits, trapping vehicles in place, and by 4:15 p.m. HAST, shoppers and employees of the mall had to flee blindly on foot or by car as burning airborne embers began setting fire to rooftops across the grid, as the city's emergency sirens were never activated.

In March 2024, the Army Corps of Engineers awarded a $159 million commercial district cleanup contract to local Native Hawaiian Organization (NHO) firm Hui Huliau Technology Services. This funding was explicitly allocated to demolish unsafe standing skeletons, clear toxic ash, and manage structural remains across Lahaina's commercial district, including the remains of the Outlets of Maui; the mall was completely destroyed by the wildfires, including the physical buildings that once housed Hard Rock Cafe and Bubba Gump, and was ultimately razed as a result of the aftermath.

Until November 2026, the 11-acre (4.5 ha) parcel sat entirely vacant as a cleared gravel lot, following an intentional policy by the County of Maui that explicitly prioritized residential housing recovery over commercial reconstruction.

==== 'Ulu o Lele Marketplace ====
On July 2, 2026, Maui County announced that an $8 million marketplace known as 'Ulu o Lele (Growth of Lele) would be developed on the former site of the Outlets of Maui, marking the first major commercial rebuilding project in the area since the wildfires, and an expected opening of September, with 17 tenants utilizing solar power ranging from 144 square feet (13.4 m^{2}) to 240 square feet (22 m^{2}), eight food trucks, and a stage for entertainment.

'Ulu o Lele opened on November 11, 2026, which intentionally features local tenants affected by the wildfires.

== See also ==
- Wharf Cinema Center Shops
