= Wharf Cinema Center Shops =

Destroyed mall and cinema in Lahaina, Hawaii, U.S.

The Wharf Cinema Center
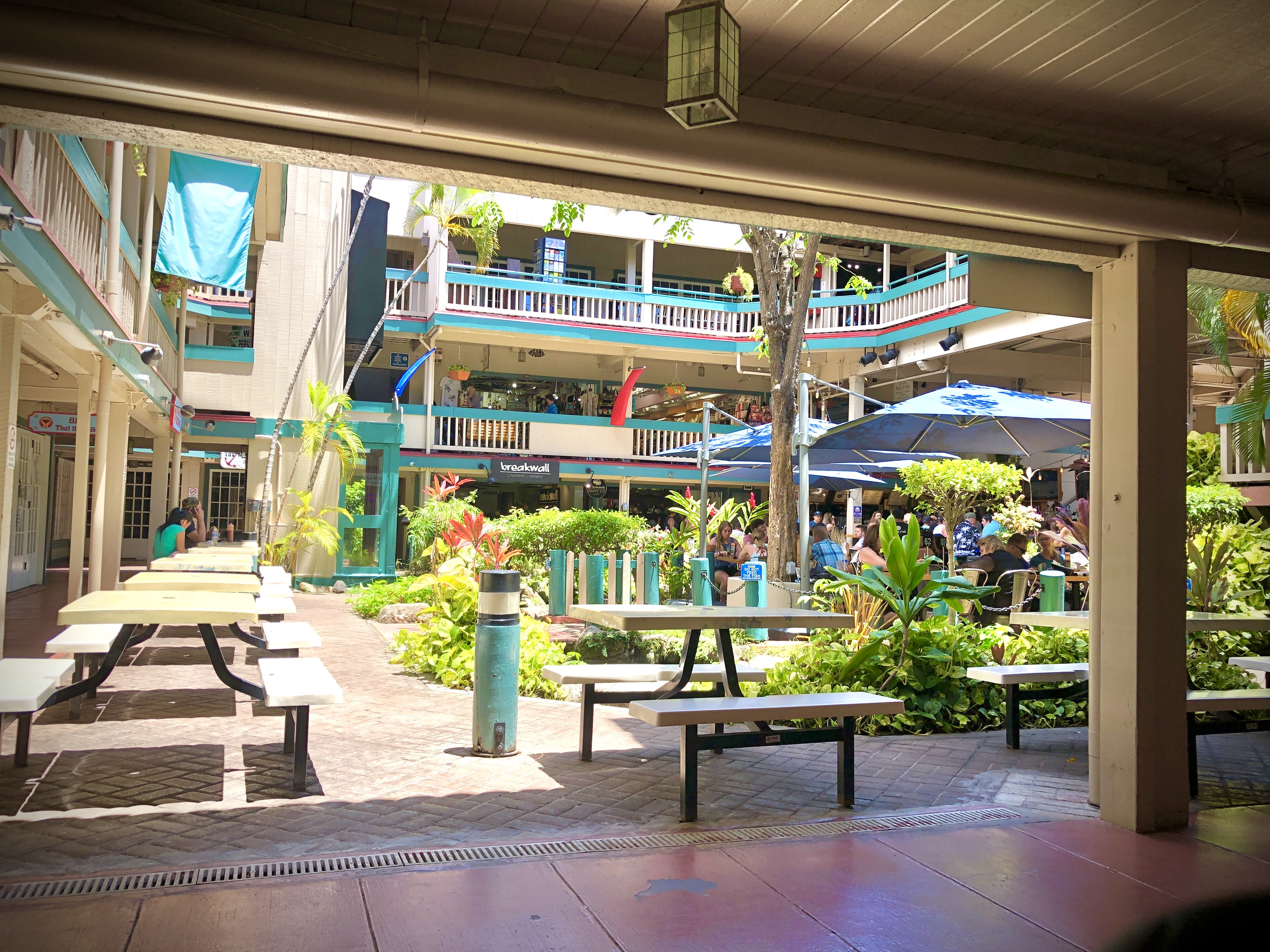
- Interior view/Outdoor courtyard (Note: All images were taken June 2019)
- Location: Lahaina, Hawaii, U.S.
- Address: 658 Front Street, 96761
- Opened: August 1978; 48 years ago (The Wharf); March 3, 1989; 37 years ago (3-Screen Cinema)
- Renovated: March 3, 1989; February 25, 2010; March 14, 2022
- Closed: August 8, 2023; 3 years ago
- Demolished: March 2024 (heavily damaged on August 8, 2023)
- Previous names: Lahaina Plaza (planning, c. October 1975)
- Developer: Global Construction Company
- Owner: Peake / Levoy (The Wharf) 3-Screen Cinema: Wallace Theater Corporation (1989–1999 as Wallace Theaters, 1999–2013 as Hollywood Theaters); Regal Entertainment Group (2013–2020); Regency Theatres (2022–2023)
- Architect: Media Five; Bonwui Ui
- Num. of stores: Before wildfire: 35+ (at peak); After wildfire: None
- Num. of anchor tenants: Before wildfire: 1 (3-Screen Cinema); After wildfire: None
- Floor area: 56,010 square feet (5,200 m^{2})
- Floors: 3
- Parking: Validated surface lot (rear)
- Website: www.thewharfshops.com
- Building details
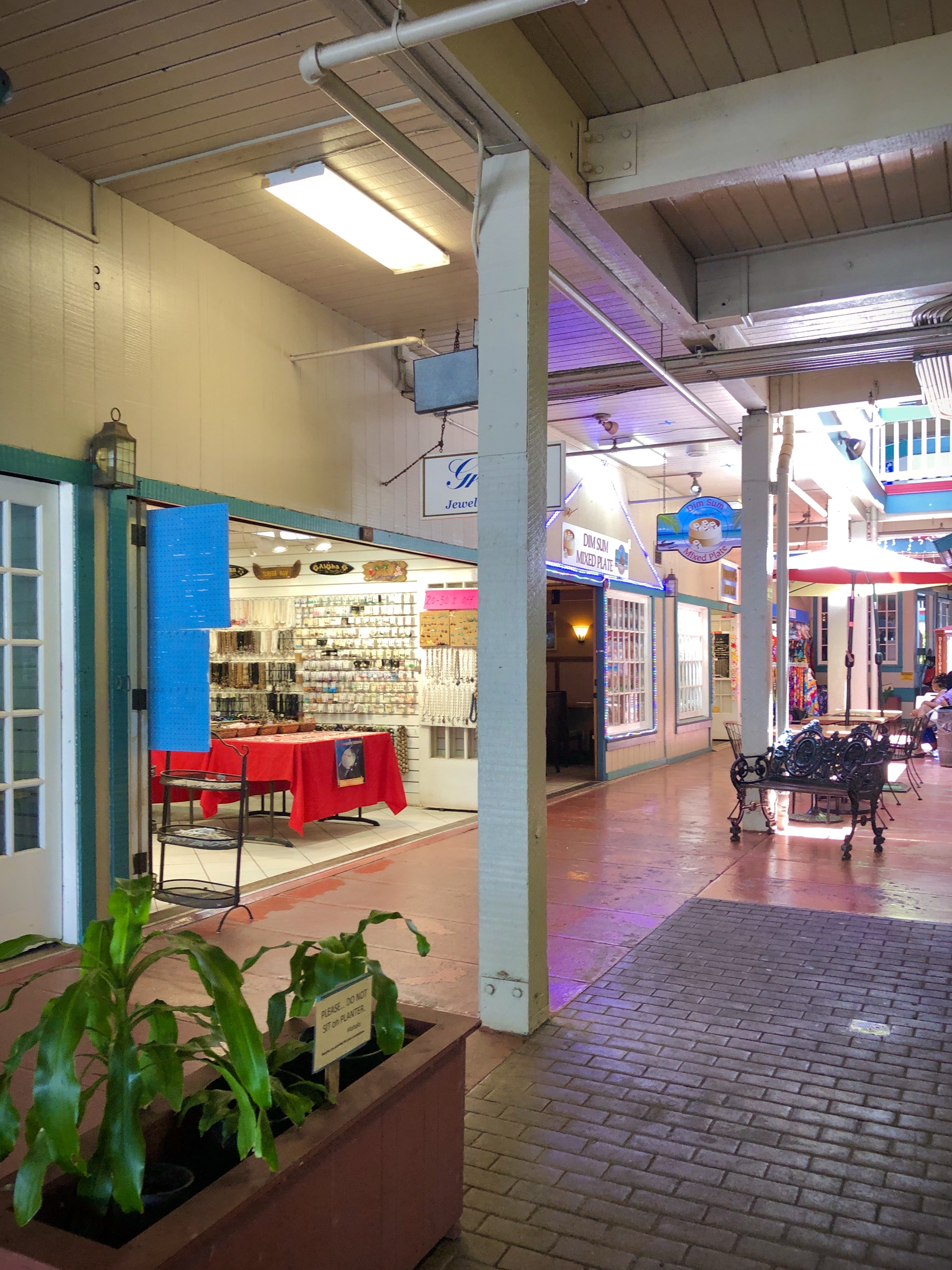
- Plaza Level concourse

General information
- Status: Destroyed

Design and construction
- Main contractor: Global Construction Company

The Wharf Cinema Center, formally Wharf Cinema Center Shops & Restaurants (or informally The Wharf and The Wharf Shops) was an open-air shopping plaza and movie theater in Lahaina, Maui, Hawaii, United States.

The mall was originally designed with historic architecture to match the town's 19th-century aesthetics and included three levels: Plaza Level, Wharf Level, and Theatre Level, which housed the cinema (hence the name "Theatre" Level) and Cool Cat Cafe. The Wharf 3 Cinemas was initially a Wallace Theaters, rebranded under their Hollywood Theaters banner after acquiring the company in April 1999.

Regal Entertainment Group acquired Hollywood Theaters in April 2013, and the space was rebranded as Regal Cinemas until January 2020, when they vacated due to lease expirations. The cinema was rebranded for a final time by Regency Theatres in March 2022, before the entire complex was destroyed by the 2023 Hawaii wildfires and eventually demolished in March 2024 during the phased cleanup process.

As of October 2025, notable businesses such as Cool Cat Cafe and Down The Hatch are or already are in the process of relocating, and focus on commercial rebuilding has started; the Wharf's owners have the intent to reconstruct, but since then, the property has remained closed until further notice.

== History ==
=== 1973–1975: Planning and construction ===
Following the County of Maui's 1968 General Plan to revitalize Front Street into a commercial property, 658 Front Street was targeted by developers in 1973, adjacent to the Lahaina Banyan Tree and the Pioneer Inn, and initial zoning discussions opened with the Maui Historic Commission to transition the site from its residential use to an integrated commercial marketplace.

In October 1975, a formal, public announcement occurred via the submission by William Wilmore, President of the Global Construction Company, Inc. of the Final Environmental Impact Statement (FEIS) for the project's initial development name, Lahaina Plaza. The location selected featured a portion of 43,000 square feet (4,000 m^{2}) in an 11.761-acre (4.760 ha) parcel, situated on a vacant, scrub-covered lot bounded by Front, Papalaua, Baker, and Wainee Streets, positioned within Lahaina Historic District 2. The proposal would feature a two-story commercial development with 51,708 square feet (4,803.8 m^{2}), and prioritized the inclusion of 262 parking spaces and six tour bus slots to alleviate traffic congestion from the neighboring inn.

Construction would be expected to last for nearly one year, expected to cost $1.5 million, and the Global Construction Co. warned that if the plans are not approved, the site would continue to stay vacant with a critical limitation of parking. The structural blueprint designated the ground level for 30 retail stalls, while assigning the second floor to a maximum of four restaurant spaces, and the architecture would mimic Lahaina's 19th-century aesthetic. The Wharf was designed by Media Five, and the design architect was Bonwui Ui.

=== 1989–2022: After opening ===
On March 3, 1989, the mall was expanded with the opening of the Wharf Cinema 3 movie theater on the third level, operated by Wallace Theater Corporation, thus changing its name from "The Wharf" to "The Wharf Cinema Center." Cool Cat Cafe opened in March 2003.

On October 2, 2008, because the center's theater was built across staggered tiers with an intricate network of mezzanine walkways, the United States Department of Justice Civil Rights Division stepped in to enforce the Americans with Disabilities Act (ADA). An official federal settlement agreement legally mandated that Wallace Theaters physically restructure the theater auditoriums to guarantee line-of-sight companion seating, wheelchair access ramps, and physical architectural modifications across the facility's upper deck.

In 2010, Sean Corpuel, owner of Cool Cat Cafe, acquired and opened Captain Jack's Island Grill at the center. The Wharf's movie theater was rebranded under Wallace Theater Holdings LLC's Hollywood Theaters brand, and reopened on February 25, 2010 after extensive renovations added updated paint jobs and seating, Dolby Digital sound, and fitted carpeting. The Lahaina Visitor Center was temporarily moved to the Wharf in June 2010 due to undergoing renovations on the Old Lahaina Courthouse.

Maui Friends of the Library established a 700 sq ft (65 m^{2}) retail space near the cinema on January 9, 2012. Regal Cinemas acquired Hollywood Theaters for $191 million in February 2013, with the buyout being closed in April 2013 and the movie theater being rebranded once more as Regal Wharf Cinema Center 3. The Blue Lagoon Tropical Bar & Grill went up for sale in August 2013, with an asking price of $149,000.

Makani Kai Island Grill and Bar, a tropical restaurant inspired by Jimmy Buffett's Margaritaville, had its grand opening on April 10, 2014. Down The Hatch was established at the center in June 2015. On May 25, 2017, the Plantation Days Museum was expanded and opened, showing a video titled "The Last Harvest," which went over the final days of the Pioneer Mill Co. before it closed in 1999.

On January 16, 2020, Regal shuttered the 3-screen cinema as its lease expired. The Wharf Cinema Center was acquired by Peake / Levoy as the new mall management on February 12, 2020. The former Regal was renovated and reopened as Regency Wharf Cinemas on March 14, 2022 after Regency Theatres acquired it.

=== August 2023 Hawaii wildfires and redevelopment status ===
On August 8, 2023 at 2:55 p.m. HAST, the initial brush fire caused by Hurricane Dora winds knocking out power and utility poles suffered a catastrophic afternoon flare-up near its original ignition point, caused by 60–80 mph gale-force winds.

By 3:30 p.m. HAST, the fire jumped containment lines and rapidly tore down the slope toward the ocean, causing massive traffic bottlenecks forming instantly on Front Street. Escape paths were severely hindered because fallen utility poles and live electrical lines blocked the main highway exits, trapping vehicles in place, and by 4:15 p.m. HAST, shoppers and employees of the center had to flee blindly on foot or by car as burning airborne embers began setting fire to rooftops across the grid, as the city's emergency sirens were never activated.

In March 2024, the Army Corps of Engineers awarded a $159 million commercial district cleanup contract to local Native Hawaiian Organization (NHO) firm Hui Huliau Technology Services, which was for to raze unsafe standing skeletons, clear toxic ash, and manage structural remains across Lahaina's commercial district, including the remains of the Wharf Cinema Center; the center was completely destroyed by the wildfires, and was ultimately demolished as a result of the aftermath. One worker of Cool Cat Cafe died from the wildfire.

However, as of November 2024, the property owners of the Wharf Cinema Center have been in interest of rebuilding, though they face legislative hurdles, as modern Maui County community plans restrict rebuilds in the historic district to 35 feet. Former businesses of the mall have relocated to other areas; in Corpuel's case, the Sands of Kahana Resort for Captain Jack's Island Grill, and Kihei for Cool Cat Cafe. By October 2025, focus finally began shifting to rebuilding Front Street, though local tenants have pressured Maui County to move faster.

== Gallery ==
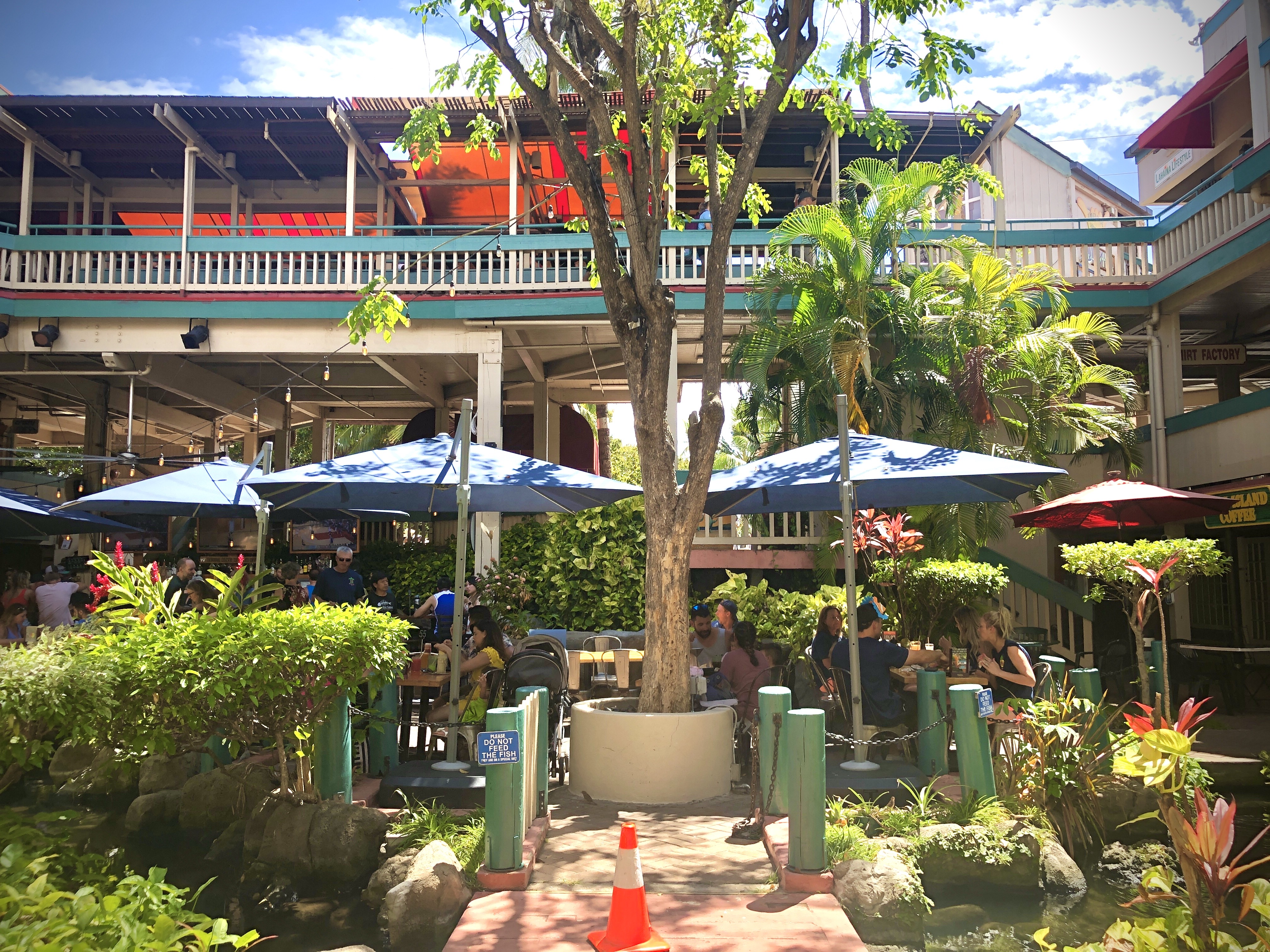
Outdoor courtyard

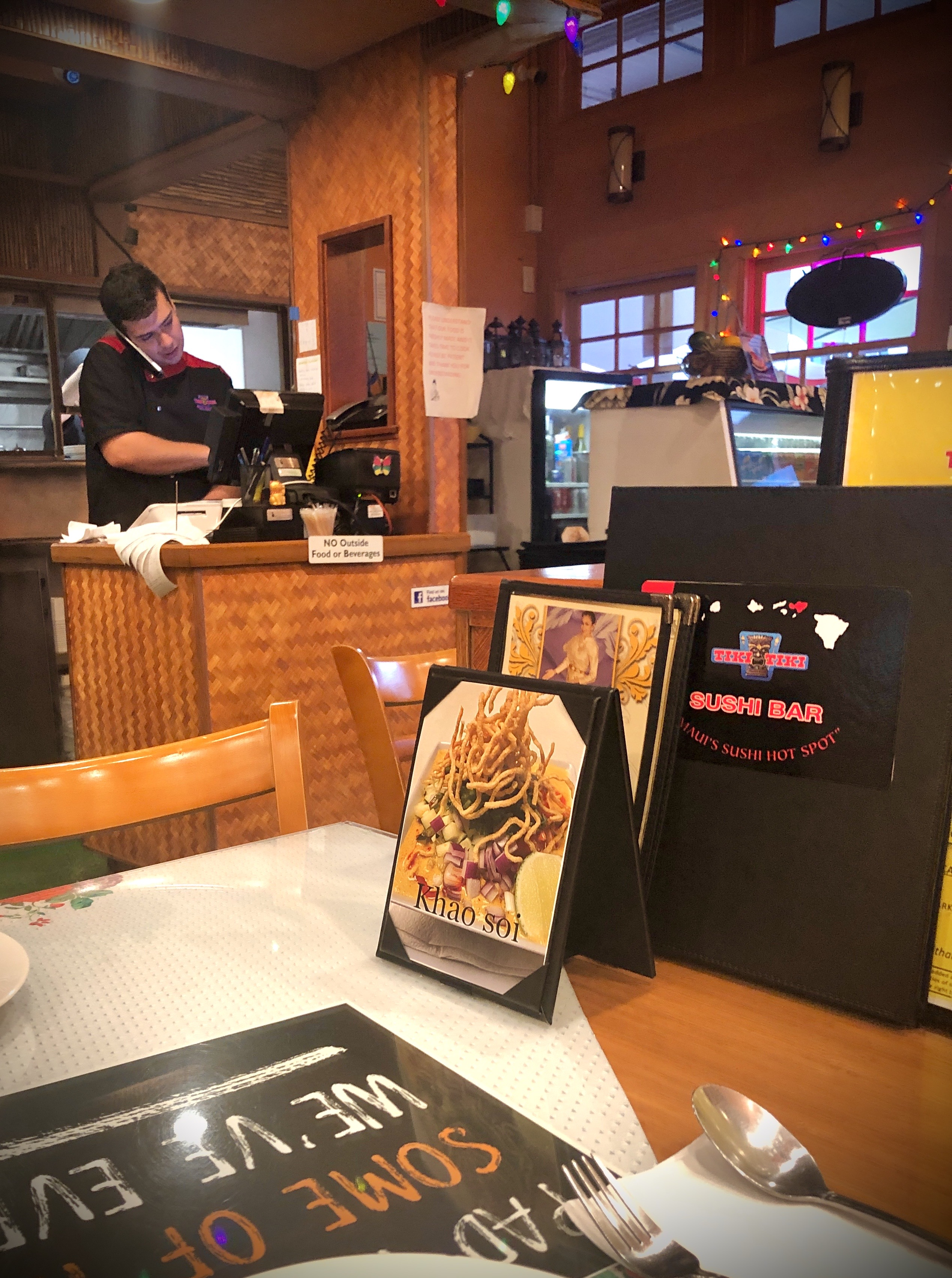
Tiki Tiki Sushi Bar

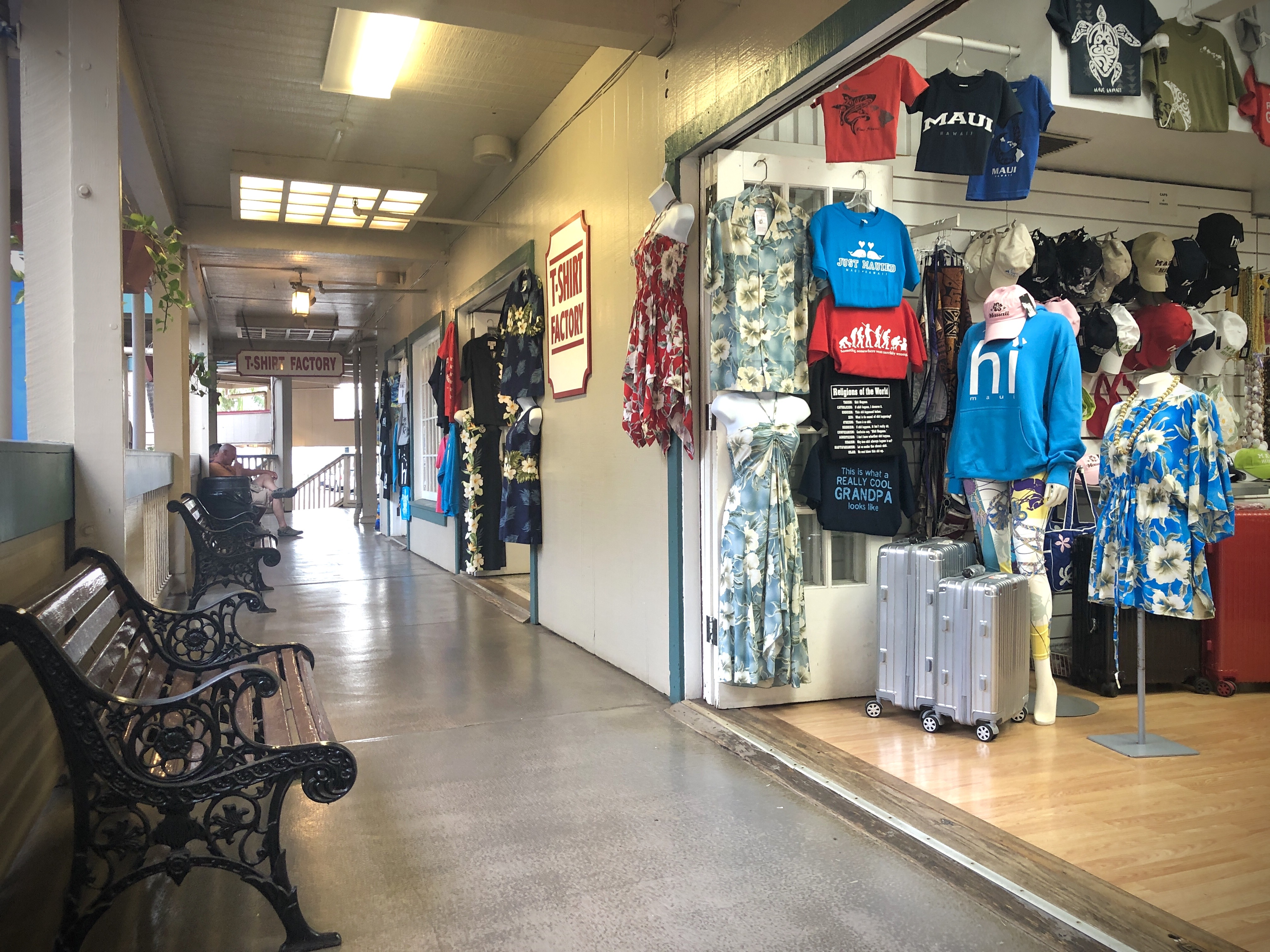
T-Shirt Factory

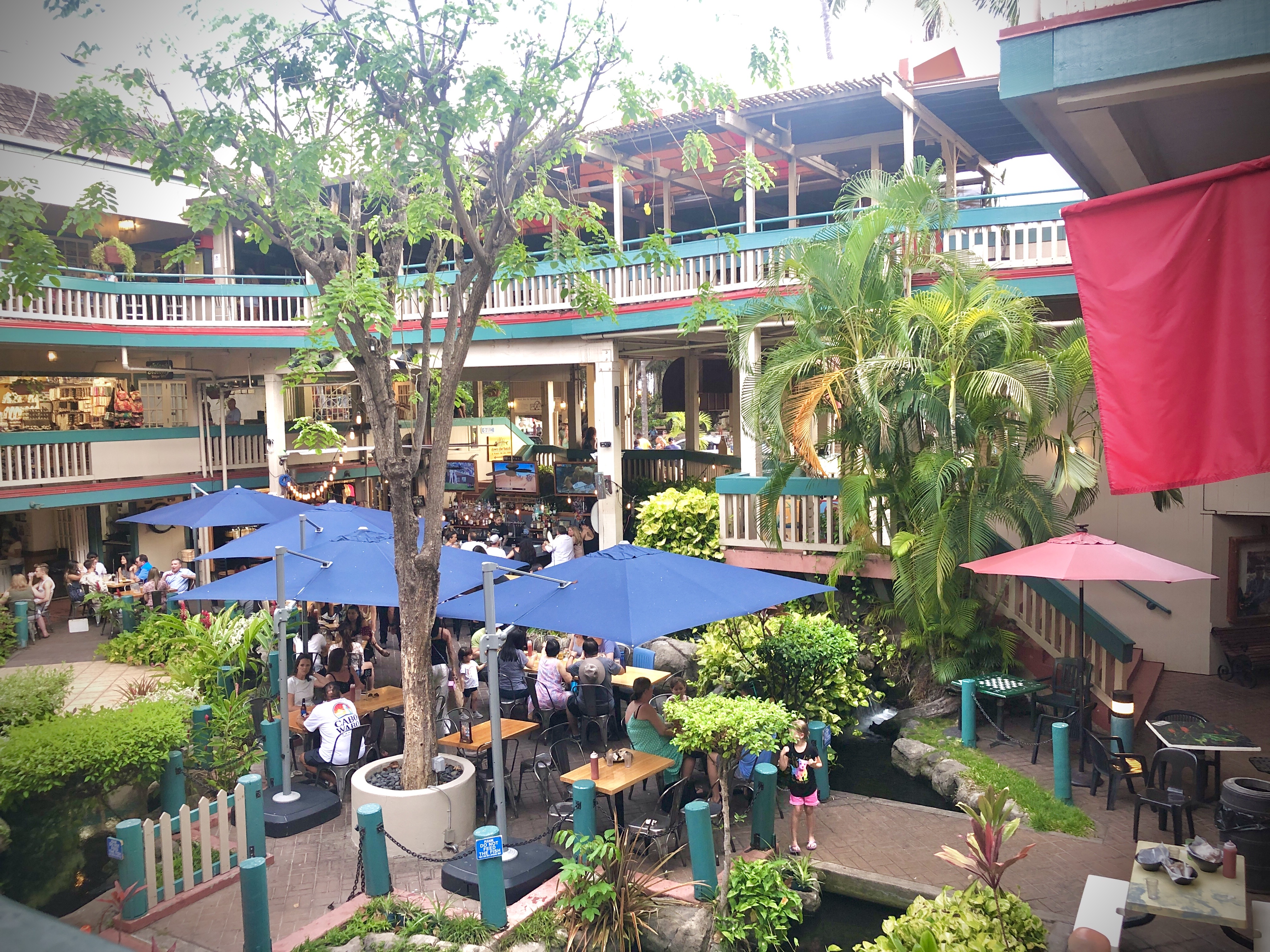
Outdoor courtyard (Alt view)

== See also ==
- Outlets of Maui
