= National Relaxation Day =

Annual event on August 15th

- Observed by: United States
- Type: National
- Date: 15 August
- Frequency: Annual

National Relaxation Day is an annual event on 15 August. It was proposed by nine-year-old Sean Moeller of Clio, Michigan in 1985. Moeller's grandfather, William D. Chase was the founder of Chase's Calendar of Annual Events

The event is recognised on social media with the hashtag #NationalRelaxationDay – which has been used by a range of public institutions, media organisations and charities such as BBC Earth, the Mental Health Foundation, The New Scientist, Sport England and the US Army. National Relaxation Day has also been utilized by Tommy Bahama for marketing purposes. National Relaxation Day is sometimes confused with National Slacker Day, which was created in Britain as a homage to National Relaxation Day.

Starting in 2016, Moeller recognizes one individual for having a noteworthy proclivity for relaxation. This year, the distinction has been bestowed upon Erin Nukic, who is near and dear to the heart of Moeller. In 2021 Erin and Sean married, and are now co-sponsors of National Relaxation Day.
