= Sartain Lanier =

American businessman and philanthropist

- Born: 1909; Winchester, Tennessee, U.S.
- Died: November 30, 1994 (aged 84–85); Atlanta, Georgia, U.S.
- Education: Hume Fogg High School
- Alma mater: Vanderbilt University
- Occupation: Businessman
- Spouses: Claudia Gwynn Whitson; Elizabeth Moorman Tuller
- Children: 3, including J. Hicks Lanier
- Parent(s): John Hicks Lanier; Nettie Sartain

Sartain Lanier (1909 – November 30, 1994) was an American businessman and philanthropist from Tennessee. With his brothers, Lanier co-founded The Lanier Company in 1934, an office products company currently known as Lanier Worldwide, a subsidiary of Ricoh. In 1942, Lanier acquired the Atlanta, Georgia-based Oxford Manufacturing Company, later known as Oxford Industries. He served as its chairman and chief executive officer, and took it public on the New York Stock Exchange in 1963.

== Early life ==
Sartain Lanier was born in 1909 in Winchester, Tennessee. His father was John Hicks Lanier and his mother, Nettie Sartain. He had two brothers, Hicks and Thomas, and a sister, Eleanor. He grew up in Nashville, Tennessee, from the age of 5.

Lanier was educated at Hume Fogg High School. He graduated from Vanderbilt University in 1931.

== Career ==
Lanier and his brothers co-founded the Lanier Company in Nashville in 1934. It was later renamed Lanier Business Products. The firm initially sold the Ediphone, a phonograph cylinder made by Thomas A. Edison, Inc., and later machines used in offices. By 1976, the company was criticized for incurring the 1973–75 recession as their products led to a lesser need for secretarial employees and thus higher unemployment. However, Lanier retorted that businesses had become more profitable thanks to those products. The company was acquired by the Harris Corporation in 1983, and by Ricoh in 2000, where it became a subsidiary known as Lanier Worldwide.

In 1942, in the midst of World War II, Lanier and his brothers acquired 50% of the Oxford Manufacturing Company, a textile concern of uniforms for the United States Army headquartered in Atlanta, Georgia. Lanier served as its chairman and chief executive officer. He expanded the business to men's and women's apparel, and renamed it Oxford Industries. In 1958, the Lanier brothers acquired the Freezer Shirt Corporation of Gaffney, South Carolina. In 1963, the Oxford Company was listed as a public company on the New York Stock Exchange, with an annual revenue of US$60 million, 6,000 employees, 20 factories, 10 warehouses, and facilities in New York City. By 1968, the Gaffney subsidiary was known as the Carolina Apparel Co. That same year, the company reported record sales and profits. Also in 1968, after his brother Thomas died, both Sartain and his brother J. Hicks inherited his shares from Lanier Properties, the warehouse company for Oxford Industries; those shares were acquired by the company. By 1971, Sartain predicted that men were unlikely to return to wearing "the grey flannel suit and the conservative tie", preferring to wear colors and special fabrics.

Lanier served on the Boards of Directors of Standard Brands (now Nabisco), the Trust Company of Georgia (now SunTrust Banks), the Genuine Parts Company, and Southern Airways.

== Civic activities ==
Lanier established the Sartain Lanier Family Foundation, a philanthropic family foundation. He served on the board of trust of his alma mater, Vanderbilt University, for thirty years. He also endowed the Lanier Scholarships, three scholarships given to high school graduates from Atlanta to attend Vanderbilt University for free for the entire four years of their college careers.

== Personal life and death ==
Lanier married Claudia Gwynn Whitson in 1934 at the Wright Chapel of the Scarritt College for Christian Workers. They had three children, including J. Hicks Lanier. Claudia died of cancer in 1972, and in 1976 Lanier married Elizabeth Moorman Tuller.

Lanier died on November 30, 1994, at the Piedmont Hospital in Atlanta, Georgia, aged 85. His funeral was held at the Episcopal Cathedral of Saint Philip in Atlanta.
