= Rite Rug Flooring =

American flooring retailer

RiteRug Flooring
- Type: Private
- Industry: Home Improvement
- Founded: 1934
- Founder: Duke Goldberg; Stanley Goldberg
- Headquarters: Whitehall, Ohio, U.S.
- Number of locations: 40
- Area served: Florida, Georgia, Illinois, Indiana, Kentucky, North Carolina, Ohio, Pennsylvania, South Carolina, Tennessee, Virginia
- Products: Floor Coverings
- Revenue: $425 million (2021)
- Parent: Rite Rug Company
- Website: www.riterug.com

RiteRug Flooring, formerly Rite Rug, is a flooring retailer headquartered in Columbus, Ohio. RiteRug Flooring's current headquarters, distribution center, wholesale and outlet showroom are located in a 150,000 space in the Whitehall area of the city. They sell floor coverings in the Columbus area. The company had $425 million in revenue in 2021.

== History ==
=== Early history ===
Founded by brothers, Duke and Stanley Goldberg, the first Rite Rug store was opened on the corner of Cherry and High Streets in Columbus, Ohio, in 1934. They primarily sold carpet flooring and rugs. In the 1960s, Rite Rug began expanding, opening a second store on E. Main Street and then a third store on Morse Road in Columbus.

=== Today ===
Today, RiteRug Flooring is run by the second and third generations of the Goldberg family. The company has expanded its product line over 90 years of business to include the sale and installation of hardwood, laminate, tile, and vinyl flooring. RiteRug Flooring currently operates 40 stores in 11 states, 12 of which are in Central Ohio. The company serves homeowners and businesses through seven specialized divisions: Retail, In-Home shopping, Commercial, Property Management, Wholesale, Direct-to-Real Estate Agents, and Residential Home builders. RiteRug Flooring partners with a number of leading floor industry brands, including Mohawk and Shaw.

== In-Home Shopping ==
In the 1960s, the company's Shopping at Home with Mr. Edwards service was launched. The jingle "call Mr. Edwards at Rite Rug" became well known in Columbus. Today, RiteRug Flooring continues to offer this service, now known as In-Home Shopping.
