= Duck Head =

American clothing and footwear brand

- Industry: Clothing
- Founded: 1865
- Founder: George & Joe O'Bryan
- Headquarters: Atlanta, Georgia
- Area served: United States
- Owner: Oxford Industries

Duck Head is a brand name for clothing and shoes in the United States. First registered as a trademark in the late 19th century, the name has been used by several different manufacturers and retailers of apparel, primarily in the American South. Duck Head apparel had a period of great popularity in the 1980s and early 1990s.

== History ==
=== O'Bryan Manufacturing ===
The Duck Head brand was founded in 1865 in Nashville, Tennessee, by George and Joe O'Bryan, two brothers who were buying surplus U.S. Army tent material. The material was a heavy canvas known as "duck", and the brothers began making work pants and shirts out of the strong material. Their company became known as the O’Bryan Brothers Manufacturing Company. The brothers sought to register the name "Duck" as a trademark in 1892, but the U.S. Trademark Registration Office rejected their application because the term was in general use. They registered the trademark "Duck Head" instead. The company operated into the late 20th century, producing work clothing such as overalls and denim jackets under the Duck Head brand.

In 1978, David Baseheart, the O'Bryan Company's young, energetic sales director, developed an idea that quickly converted Duck Head into a fashionable brand. Baseheart fashioned a shipment of cotton khaki fabric into dress pants, applied the mallard logo to a bright yellow tag on the back of the pants, and went on the road to sell them, visiting first the University of Mississippi campus bookstore where he sold his first batch of the new Duck Head khakis. The pants sold out quickly, and a new southern U.S. trend was born. Soon, and throughout the 1980s, Duck Head khakis were standard in Southern fashion, leading a writer for Forbes magazine to observe some years later: "For a preppy southern college guy in the 1980s, Duck Head Apparel khakis were as indispensable as a pair of worn Topsiders and a pink Polo shirt."

=== Delta Woodside Industries and Tropical Sportswear International ===
In 1989, the brand was purchased by Delta Woodside Industries in an attempt to create a national brand. The Duck Head brand was very successful for Delta Woodside in the early 1990s. The Duck Head product line had been limited to casual cotton pants for men, but Delta Woodside expanded it by adding woven and knit shirts, shorts, and women's clothing to the Duck Head brand product line. During the company's 1992 fiscal year, gross sales revenue from Duck Head clothing totaled more than $130 million. In the following years, however, the brand's popularity declined and Delta Woodside experienced financial losses, and in 1999, the company spun off Duck Head Apparel in an attempt to save the company. Tropical Sportswear International bought the Duck Head Apparel company in 2001, but went bankrupt in 2005.

=== Shoes ===
Duck Head Shoes began being produced in the 1990s by Old Dominion Footwear of Madison Heights, Virginia.

=== Goody's Family Clothing ===
In 2003, Goody's Family Clothing purchased rights to the Duck Head clothing brand for $4.1 million and made it into a private label brand, sold exclusively at Goody's stores. Sales of Duck Head branded clothing totaled more than $97 million in 2004, the last year when Goody's was a publicly traded company required to disclose financial information.

=== Prospect Brands Ownership ===
After Goody's underwent Chapter 11 bankruptcy in 2008 and then liquidated and closed all of its stores under a Chapter 7 bankruptcy filing in 2009, the Duck Head brand was put up for sale by Streambank LLC. Streambank sold the brand at auction in 2009, for a reported price of $2.65 million. It was purchased by a business group headed by Virginia retailer Ross Sternheimer, who outbid Perry Ellis International. The acquiring business established Duck Head USA, based in Richmond, Virginia, and announced plans to expand the Duck Head brand into a full line of men's, women's and children's apparel and accessories to be sold through various retailers. Prospect Brands LLC has announced it purchased the Duck Head brand from the Richmond group and the brand will be relaunched and based in downtown Greensboro, North Carolina. Greensboro is also home to apparel giant Kontour (spun out from VF Corporation) which owns brands such as Lee and Wrangler Jeans.

=== Current Ownership ===
The Lanier Apparel Division of Oxford Industries (NYSE: OXM) based in Atlanta, Georgia, acquired the Duck Head brand in 2016. The initial re-launch was primarily online, with chinos, sport shirts and t-shirts available for purchase directly from the company. In March 2018, Bill Thomas, founder of menswear brand Bill’s Khakis, was announced by Oxford Industries as the Brand Director of Duck Head.

== Marketing ==
American comedian DeWayne Jamarr Colley, known as Kountry Wayne, promoted Duck Head in a social media video in May 2023.
