= Tropical Sportswear International =

Defunct American apparel manufacturer

Tropical Sportswear Int'l Corporation
- Formerly: Tropical Garment Manufacturing Company
- Type: Public
- Traded as: Nasdaq: TSIC
- Industry: Apparel
- Founded: 1927 in Tampa, Florida, U.S.
- Defunct: 2005
- Fate: Chapter 11 bankruptcy; assets sold to Perry Ellis International
- Headquarters: Tampa, Florida, U.S.
- Key people: William W. Compton (Chairman and CEO, 1989-2002); Michael Kagan (CFO and later CEO, 2003-2005)
- Products: Men's, women's and boys' casual and dress-casual pants, shorts, jeans and shirts
- Brands: Savane, Farah, Duck Head, Bay to Bay, Flyers, The Original Khaki Co.; licensed Bill Blass, Van Heusen, John Henry and Victorinox
- Revenue: US$473 million (fiscal 2000, peak)
- Number of employees: More than 2,000 (2001)

Tropical Sportswear Int'l Corporation (TSI), known before 1989 as the Tropical Garment Manufacturing Company, was an American apparel manufacturer and marketer based in Tampa, Florida. Founded in 1927, the company became a leading producer of men's casual and dress-casual pants in the United States during the 1990s, selling clothing under owned brands such as Savane and Farah, licensed brands such as Bill Blass and Van Heusen, and numerous retailer private labels. After a rapid expansion driven by its 1998 acquisition of Farah Incorporated, the company suffered a series of operational and financial setbacks beginning in 1999 and filed for Chapter 11 bankruptcy in December 2004, selling substantially all of its assets to Perry Ellis International.

== History ==
=== Origins and turnaround ===
The company was incorporated in Tampa on November 11, 1927, and for most of its history operated as the Tropical Garment Manufacturing Company, a maker of men's casual slacks and walking shorts. By the late 1980s the company, co-owned by Tampa businessman Arnold C. Kotler, employed as many as 600 people and operated assembly plants in Costa Rica and the Dominican Republic, but had declined into a small regional manufacturer. In 1989, it was sold to two former Munsingwear executives—Farah Inc. veteran William W. ("Bill") Compton and Michael Kagan—backed by a Mexican-based investor group. Compton, who had risen from a sales job to the presidency of Farah, became chairman and chief executive, while Kagan, a former Munsingwear chief financial officer, became CFO; the Mexican banking group Accel Group S.A. retained a significant ownership stake. The company's gross sales were about $20 million in 1989.

Under Compton, the company cut costs, invested in new equipment, and shifted from contract manufacturing to producing private-label and brand-name khaki and wrinkle-free cotton pants for department stores and mass merchants. By the fiscal year ending September 1994, revenues had reached approximately $100 million, five times the 1988 level. The company became known for producing pants under dozens of brand names—including private labels for major retailers—rather than promoting its own corporate name.

=== Public offering and Farah acquisition ===
Tropical Sportswear completed a corporate reorganization in January 1997 ahead of its initial public offering, and its common stock began trading publicly on the Nasdaq National Market in October 1997.

In June 1998, Tropical acquired El Paso–based Farah Incorporated for $92.7 million, gaining the well-known Farah and Savane men's pants brands as well as the John Henry line. The acquisition roughly doubled the company's size; Compton said he expected to cut about $40 million from Farah's annual operating costs, closing or consolidating several plants. Sales rose 73 percent to $264 million in fiscal 1998, and the company's stock tripled that year even as most apparel stocks declined. In January 1999, the company announced plans to expand the Savane and private-label businesses into women's wear.

=== Distribution crisis and stock decline ===
In June and July 1999, Tropical encountered a serious operational crisis at its Tampa distribution center. The company had begun using new shipping software at the same time it was expanding the center to handle the new Farah volume, and both projects ran into problems. About $6.5 million in orders were canceled and delivery of another $4.5 million in apparel was delayed. The company warned that third-quarter earnings would fall well short of expectations, and on July 13, 1999 its shares fell as much as 42 percent in a single day. Standard & Poor's revised its outlook on the company to stable from positive and lowered its bank loan rating, citing the distribution problems and about $190 million of total debt then outstanding.

The company recovered somewhat in 2000, reporting net income and revenues of about $473 million for the fiscal year. In June 2001, however, Tropical cut about 160 jobs at its Tampa and El Paso plants, took a one-time charge for severance, and reduced its earnings and sales forecasts amid a weak economy.

=== Acquisitions and brand expansion ===
In 2001, Tropical pursued further growth through acquisitions and licensing. After a failed bid for assets of Bugle Boy Industries, for which it took a pretax charge of about $430,000, the company agreed in June 2001 to acquire Duck Head Apparel Co. in a deal valued at about $21 million, including assumed debt. The acquisition, completed in August 2001, gave Tropical a recognized brand of preppy men's and boys' clothing, a presence in the shirt business, and a chain of outlet stores. Duck Head's chairman and CEO, William V. Roberti—a longtime retail executive and former president of Brooks Brothers—joined Tropical as an executive vice president and president of its Victorinox division.

Tropical also moved upmarket by licensing the Victorinox (Swiss Army) brand to produce a line of higher-end outdoor apparel sold at retailers such as Bloomingdale's and Saks Fifth Avenue. Despite a difficult retail environment, the company reported a 12 percent first-quarter sales gain over the prior year for the period ending December 2001 and described itself as having largely avoided the broader industry slump, in part because it had no exposure to the bankrupt Kmart.

=== CEO's departure and mounting losses ===
In October 2002, Compton was diagnosed with terminal leukemia, and on November 18, 2002 he resigned as chairman, CEO and director. The company initially cited "management issues" and health reasons. In December 2002, Tropical confirmed that Compton had been ousted in part because he had billed the company for tens of thousands of dollars in personal expenses; after an investigation by outside directors, Compton reimbursed the company about $1 million, of which more than $900,000 related to personal travel on the company's two corporate jets. Compton, through his attorney, said most of the questioned expenses were legitimate business costs and that some personal items had been submitted by accident.

In January 2003, under new president and CEO Christopher Munday, Tropical reported a first-quarter net loss of $5 million, far worse than expected, as holiday-season revenue fell 10 percent to $99 million amid missed delivery dates and discounting. The results were affected by a $5.7 million charge related to Compton's departure. The company announced it would exit several noncore businesses, ending its Victorinox license (transitioning the line to Swiss Army Brands Inc.), closing most of its Duck Head retail outlet stores, and selling its two corporate aircraft. In October 2002, Forbes had reported that the company's stock, after rising 60 percent earlier in the year, had fallen into a steep decline.

In June 2003, Tropical sold the Duck Head trademarks and four related licenses to Goody's Family Clothing for $4 million in cash, accelerating the closure of its remaining outlet stores. Around the same time, the company retained Merrill Lynch to evaluate strategic alternatives, and investor Carl Icahn disclosed a stake of about 8.3 percent in the company.

=== Management shakeup and restructuring ===
On August 13, 2003, after a two-month strategic review with Merrill Lynch, Tropical's board fired several top executives, including president and CEO Christopher Munday, chief financial officer N. Larry McPherson, and general counsel Gregory Williams. Michael Kagan was named CEO; director Eloy S. Vallina-Laguera was named chairman and Richard Domino was named president. The company reported losses totaling about $130 million for fiscal 2003, including a fourth-quarter net loss of $96.5 million.

In January 2004, Kagan disclosed that, as part of a refinancing deal with creditors, the company was required to hire a turnaround consultant and planned to shift far more of its production overseas. Tropical's shares closed below $2 for the first time. In December 2003 the company had triggered and violated financial covenants under its revolving credit facility, causing a technical default that was waived in January 2004 when the facility was amended and reduced. In February 2004, the company said it would close its Tampa manufacturing facility and move the work to the Dominican Republic and Honduras, a move expected to affect hundreds of jobs. In July 2004, Tropical reorganized into three business units—branded, private brand, and mass merchant—to ease a transition "from manufacturer to marketer," and reported that it had sold a vacant Tampa headquarters building and moved its last fabric-cutting operations offshore. For the quarter ended July 3, 2004, the company reported a narrowed net loss of $5.8 million on sales that fell about 23 percent to $74.8 million, and its shares fell more than 40 percent.

=== Bankruptcy and sale ===
On December 16, 2004, Tropical Sportswear and several subsidiaries filed voluntary petitions for Chapter 11 bankruptcy in the United States Bankruptcy Court for the Middle District of Florida and entered into an asset purchase agreement to sell substantially all of its assets to Perry Ellis International for about $85 million in cash, in a sale under Section 363 of the Bankruptcy Code. To finance operations during the sale, the company secured a $50 million debtor-in-possession credit facility from The CIT Group and Fleet Capital. On February 10, 2005, the bankruptcy court approved the sale, with the final purchase price adjusted to $88.5 million in cash after accounting for inventory and receivables; the transaction, which Perry Ellis expected would add more than $230 million in annual net sales, closed later that month, ending Tropical Sportswear's existence as an independent company.

== Operations ==
Tropical Sportswear designed and cut fabric principally at its facilities in Tampa and El Paso, then shipped the cut components to independent contractors—primarily in the Dominican Republic, Mexico and Honduras—for assembly and finishing before the finished garments were returned to the United States for labeling and distribution. The company emphasized a short production cycle, advanced computer-aided design and electronic data interchange systems, and vendor-managed inventory programs for its retail customers, marketing its mission as delivering apparel "faster, better and cheaper" than competitors. Its largest customer was Wal-Mart (including Sam's Club); other major customers included Kohl's, J.C. Penney, Dillard's and various department and wholesale-club retailers.

== Brands ==
Tropical's product line featured more than 60 brands across most price points. Owned brands included Savane, Farah, Flyers, The Original Khaki Co., Bay to Bay, Two Pepper, Royal Palm, Banana Joe, Authentic Chino Casuals and, for a time, Duck Head. Licensed brands included Bill Blass, Van Heusen, John Henry and Victorinox. The company also produced apparel under numerous retailer private labels such as Puritan, Member's Mark, George, Sonoma, Croft & Barrow, St. John's Bay, Roundtree & Yorke, Geoffrey Beene, Izod, Faded Glory and White Stag.

== Litigation ==
Levi Strauss & Co. filed a 1997 trademark infringement suit against Tropical, claiming that some of Tropical's packaging resembled that of Levi's products. Tropical changed its labels several times in response.
