= J. Hicks Lanier =

American heir and businessman (born 1941)

- Born: John Hicks Lanier c. 1941
- Education: Vanderbilt University; Harvard Business School
- Occupation: Business Executive
- Known for: Former Chairman & CEO of Oxford Industries (1981–2015)
- Parent: Sartain Lanier (father)

John Hicks Lanier (born c. 1941) is an American heir and businessman. He served as the chief executive officer of Oxford Industries from 1981 to 2012, and as its chairman from 1981 to 2015.

== Business career ==
Lanier became an executive director of his family business, Oxford Industries, in 1969, and was its chairman from 1981 to 2015. Lanier also served as its CEO from 1981 to 2012.

Lanier served on the boards of Crawford & Company from 1976 to 2010, Genuine Parts Company from 1995 to 2013 and SunTrust Banks from 2003 to 2012. He has also served on the boards of Shaw Industries and Urban Realty Partners.

== Civic activities ==
Lanier has served on the boards of the American Apparel Manufacturers Association and the Georgia Chamber of Commerce. He is the chair of his family foundation, the Sartain Lanier Family Foundation.

Lanier is a former trustee of the Piedmont Medical Center, Westminster Schools of Atlanta, the Henrietta Egleston Hospital for Children, and his alma mater Vanderbilt University.

== Personal life ==
Lanier is married with three children.

=== Early life ===
J. Hicks Lanier was born circa 1941. His father, Sartain Lanier, was the co-founder Oxford Industries. He graduated from Vanderbilt University and received an M.B.A. from the Harvard Business School in 1964.
