= Hard Rock Cafe =

International restaurant chain

Hard Rock Cafe, Inc.
- Type: Private
- Industry: Casual dining restaurants
- Founded: June 14, 1971; 55 years ago London, England
- Founders: Isaac Tigrett; Peter Morton
- Headquarters: Davie, Florida, U.S. (Note: Location may also be listed as Hollywood, Florida due to a shared ZIP code.)
- Number of locations: 165 restaurants
- Owner: Hard Rock International (Seminole Tribe of Florida)
- Website: cafe.hardrock.com

Hard Rock Cafe is a chain of theme bar-restaurants, memorabilia shops, and museums founded in 1971 by Isaac Tigrett and Peter Morton in London. In 1979, the cafe began covering its walls with rock and roll memorabilia, a tradition which expanded to others in the chain. The chain began to expand internationally in 1982 with a location in Los Angeles. In March 2007, the parent company of the Hard Rock Cafe, was sold to the Seminole Tribe of Florida. The Hard Rock Cafe is now owned by Hard Rock International, a wholly-owned business of the Seminole Tribe.

== History ==
=== 1971–1990: First locations ===
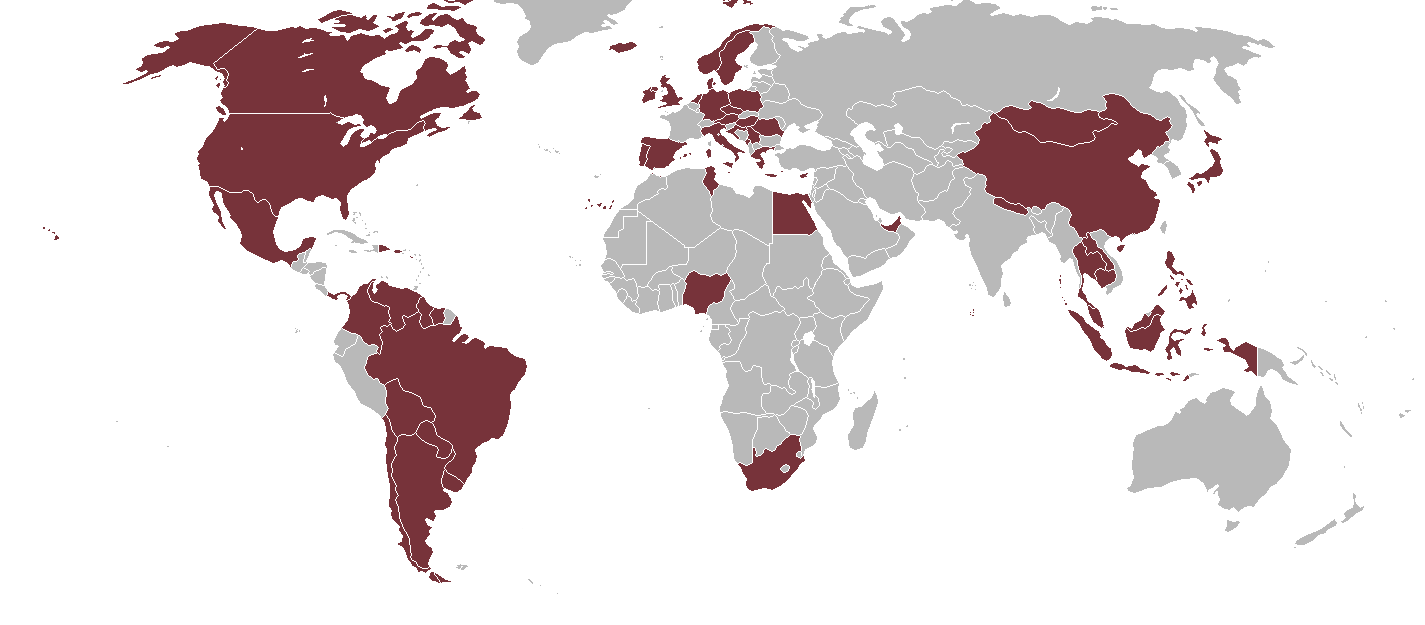
Areas where Hard Rock Cafes are located as of 2026

The first Hard Rock Cafe opened on June 14, 1971, at 150 Old Park Lane, Hyde Park, London, under the ownership of two Americans, Isaac Tigrett and Peter Morton. Hard Rock initially had an eclectic decor, but it later started to display memorabilia. In 1978, a second location was opened in Toronto, Canada.

The chain began to expand worldwide in 1982 when Morton opened Hard Rock Cafes in Los Angeles, San Francisco, Chicago, Houston, and Tigrett opened locations in Jackson, Tennessee, New York City, Dallas, Boston, Washington, D.C., Orlando as well as Paris (opened in 1991, closed in 2024) and Berlin. Hard Rock Cafe locations in the US vary from smaller, more tourist-driven markets (Biloxi, Pigeon Forge, Key West) to large metropolises (Philadelphia, Baltimore, New York City, Chicago, Boston, Washington, D.C.).

Hard Rock Cafe typically does not franchise cafe locations in the United States. All U.S. cafes are corporate owned and operated, except for the (now closed) Four Winds New Buffalo casino. However, in the transition of the Hard Rock Hotel & Casino, Las Vegas property, originally owned and then later sold to the Rank Group by founder Peter Morton, Morton retained hotel naming rights west of the Mississippi. When Morton sold his Las Vegas Hard Rock Hotel to the Morgans Hotel Group, he also sold those naming rights, which then gave rise to two US franchised hotels (without cafes) in Albuquerque and Tulsa. (The Albuquerque hotel no longer pays for the Hard Rock rights and reverted to its former name in June 2013.) Additional casino hotels franchised from Morgan's were subsequently opened in Sioux City, Iowa, and Hard Rock Casino Vancouver (which also no longer pays for the Hard Rock rights and rebranded as Great Canadian Casino Vancouver).

=== 1990–present: Buyouts, expansion, and closures ===
In 1990, The Rank Group acquired Mecca Leisure Group and continued expansion of the concept in its geographic territory. Rank went on to purchase Hard Rock America from Peter Morton, as well as Hard Rock Canada from Nick Bitove. At the Canadian Tire Centre, the stadium formerly housed Ottawa's first Hard Rock Cafe when it opened as The Palladium on January 15, 1996, and for many years when it was known as the Corel Centre. The cafe closed on August 8, 2002.

In Argentina, the first Hard Rock Cafe opened in 1995 in Recoleta, Buenos Aires. After the completion of these acquisitions, Rank gained worldwide control of the brand, though they made a complete exit from Western Canada in June 2000, with the permanent closures of the Banff, Vancouver, Calgary, Whistler and Edmonton locations. The brand's smallest cafe was located at the historic Elks Lodge building in Aspen, Colorado, which closed its doors on November 5, 2000, though the brand stated that they are not abandoning the Aspen market. However, as of January 2001, the city remains without a new location.

In March 2007, the Seminole Tribe of Florida acquired Hard Rock Cafe International, Inc. and other related entities from Rank for US$965 million, forming the corporate entity Hard Rock International, with Hard Rock Cafe owned as a subsidiary. Hard Rock International expanded into hotels and casinos with Hard Rock Hotel and Casino, which operates separately from Hard Rock Cafe. After this acquisition, Hard Rock International has been permanently closing HRC locations nationwide in the 2010s and 2020s following a shift to casino hotels.

In 2008, anonymous members of the wait staff in London criticized the Hard Rock Cafe business because of its practice of paying them less than half the official minimum wage in the UK, with the business allocating the tips to staff wages, thus bringing their salaries within the minimum wage requirements. Most customers, it was argued, do not realize that they are subsidizing a low wage when they give the tip. A 42,000-square-foot (3,900 m^{2}) flagship restaurant opened at the Showcase Mall on the Las Vegas Strip on October 15, 2009.

The Destin, Florida, location closed permanently on June 21, 2014. In 2016, a location opened in Ushuaia, Argentina in the province of Tierra del Fuego, with another being opened in the city of Puerto Iguazu in 2024.

Canada had numerous restaurants but many of them closed, notably the one at Yonge-Dundas Square (now Sankofa Square) in Toronto in May 2017, which had been the chain's second location, leaving just two in that country, Niagara Falls, Ontario, and the Hard Rock Casino in Coquitlam, British Columbia. The Outlets of Maui location in Hawaii at 900 Front Street, and original Las Vegas cafe on Paradise Road both closed permanently on December 31, 2016; the Las Vegas closure was to funnel traffic to the newer Showcase Mall location nearby, while Hard Rock did not provide a reason for the Maui closure. The building that housed the Maui location was completely destroyed by the 2023 Hawaii wildfires, alongside the Outlets of Maui.

The Detroit, Michigan, location closed in January 2019 after Hard Rock Cafe chose not to renew their lease. The brand closed its original 1986 location at McKinney Avenue in Dallas, Texas, in 2009 to relocate to Victory Park; this location would also close on July 31, 2019 after refusing to renew their lease.

The Phoenix, Arizona, location also shuttered on February 28, 2020, due to lease expiration, and became The Ainsworth, a restaurant, sports bar, and privatized event space.

The Denver, Colorado, location at 16th Street Mall would also close on July 29, 2023, as their lease expired. The Chicago location closed on March 29, 2025, as industry leaders explained was no longer profitable; furthermore, Hard Rock International owned the property, meaning the closure was a strategic business decision. In Canada, two Hard Rock Cafe restaurants remained open by 2026, in Ottawa and Niagara Falls, with a reopening planned in Toronto after renovation. Announced on June 22, 2026, the flagship Miami location at Bayside Marketplace will close permanently on August 19, 2026.

== Music memorabilia ==
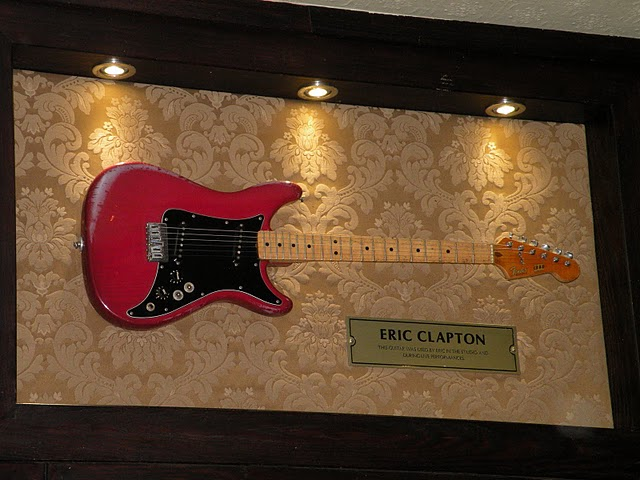
Eric Clapton's Lead II Fender, the first piece of memorabilia donated to the first Hard Rock Cafe in London in 1979

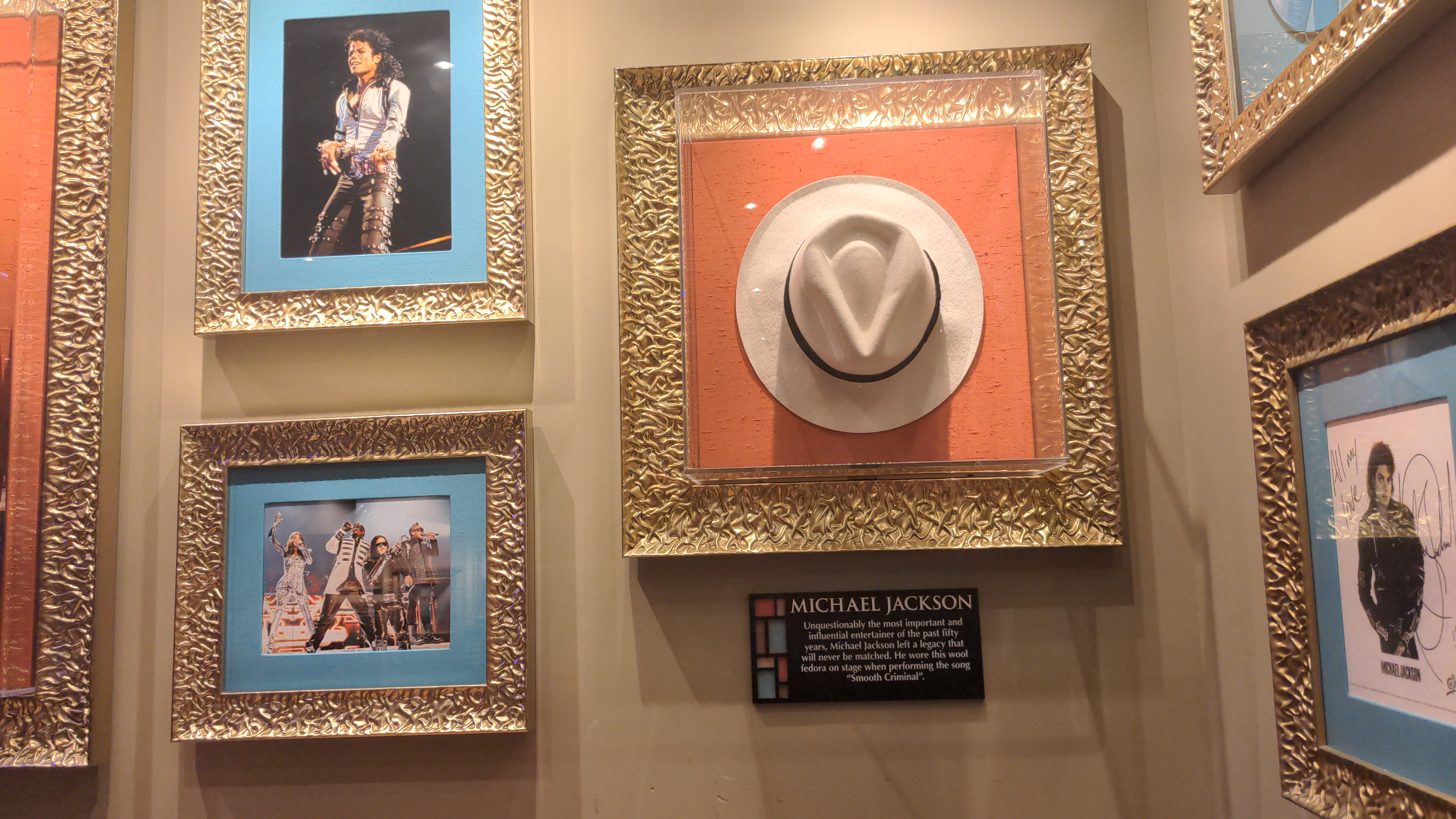
One of the fedoras worn by Michael Jackson when performing the song "Smooth Criminal" on stage. Displayed at Hard Rock Cafe.

HRC is known for its collection of rock-and-roll memorabilia. The cafes solicit donations of music memorabilia but also purchase a number of items at auctions around the world, including autographed guitars, costumes from world tours and rare photographs; these are often to be found mounted on cafe walls. The collection began in 1979 with an un-signed Red Fender Lead II guitar from Eric Clapton, who was a regular at the first restaurant in London. Clapton wanted management to hang the guitar over his regular seat in order to lay claim to that spot, and they obliged. This prompted Pete Townshend of The Who to give one of his guitars, also un-signed with the note "Mine's as good as his! Love, Pete." Hard Rock's archive includes over 80,000 items, and is the largest private collection of Rock and Roll memorabilia in the world. Marquee pieces from the collection were briefly displayed in a Hard Rock museum named "The Vault" in Orlando, Florida, from January 2003 until September 2004. After the closure, items were distributed to various restaurant locations, and the museum was demolished in 2008 alongside the Mercado shopping center which housed it. The London Vault remains open and free to visitors, located in the retail Rock Shop of the original cafe.

The Hard Rock Cafe is also in possession of a Bedford VAL three axle coach. The vehicle was completely refurbished. It is currently displayed in the US, but makes regular appearances in events in the UK, especially at the original Hard Rock Cafe in London. In 2001, a competition was run to win the bus, but it was never given away and remained with the cafe. On June 10, 2021, Hard Rock announced Lionel Messi as its Hard Rock brand ambassador as the company celebrated its 50th anniversary.

== Political donation ==
In 2025, the parent company of the Hard Rock Cafe, Hard Rock International, was one of the donors who funded the White House's East Wing demolition, and planned building of a ballroom.

== Matters of interest ==
A Hard Rock Cafe exists in Empire, Colorado, that is not part of the chain. It was established in 1934

Side 1 of The Doors' 1970 album Morrison Hotel is titled Hard Rock Cafe. A café of that name in Los Angeles (now closed) is pictured on the back of the album. In 1977 album Simple Things, Carole King wrote the song "Hard Rock Café". In her autobiography A Natural Woman, she reports that she was inspired by a bar in downtown Los Angeles and a small restaurant in Idaho with the same name. At the time, she was not aware of the similarity in name to the restaurant chain. HRC founders Morton and Tigrett were allegedly inspired to give the name by the same bar in Los Angeles. Olivia Molina sang the German version of the song. Until February 2017, there was a café in Heidelberg called Hard Rock Café, but it did not belong to the group; after a series of court cases, the restaurant had to change its name.

During the 2022 Russian invasion of Ukraine, Hard Rock Cafe refused to withdraw from the Russian market. An April 28, 2022, study by Yale University, intended to identify how companies were reacting to the invasion, placed Hard Rock Cafe in the "Buying Time" category, meaning "Holding Off New Investments/Development: companies postponing future planned investment/development/marketing while continuing substantive business". The only Hard Rock Cafe in Moscow was closed in October 2022.

== Gallery ==
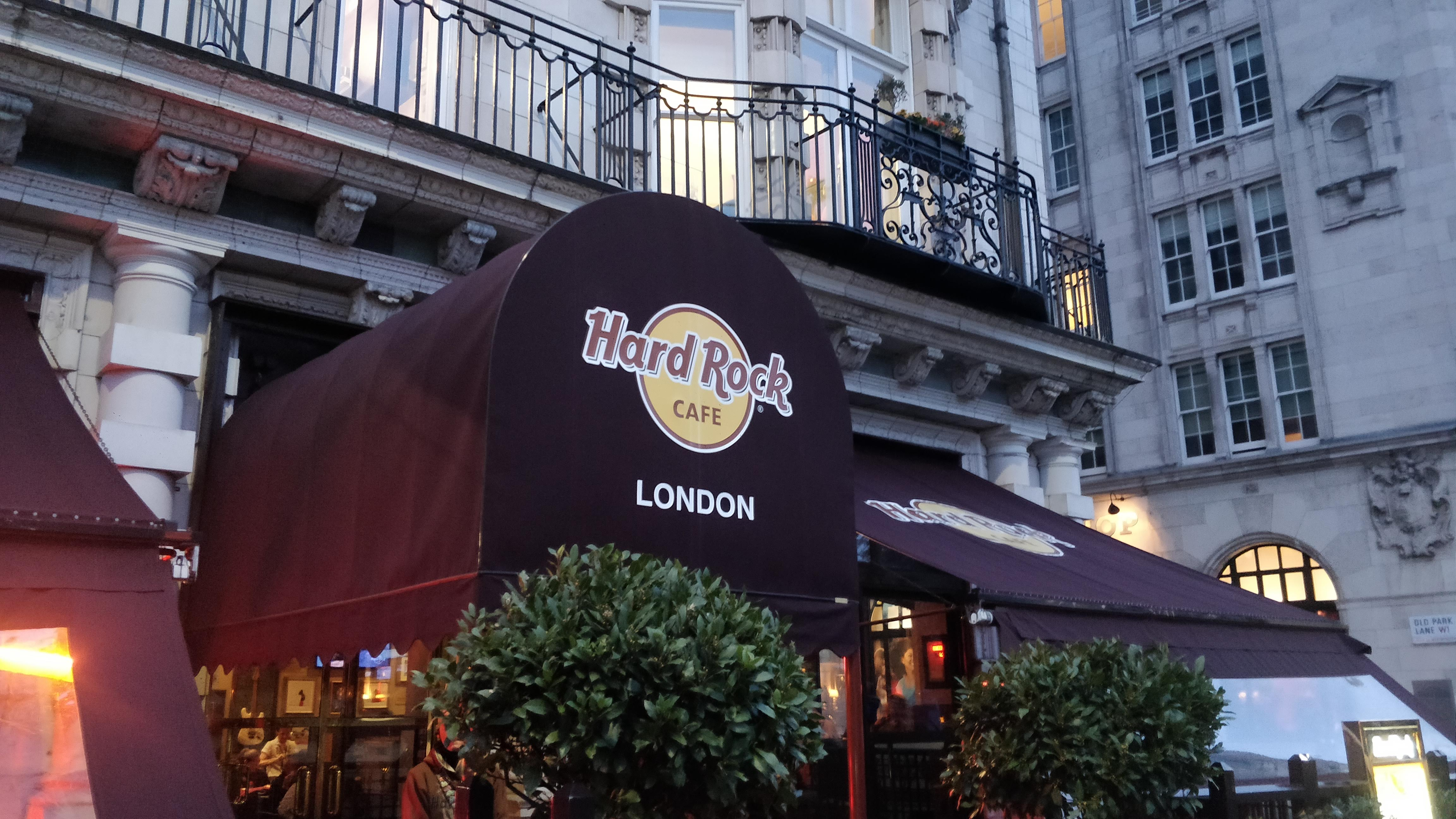
Hard Rock Cafe in London, the first restaurant founded in 1971

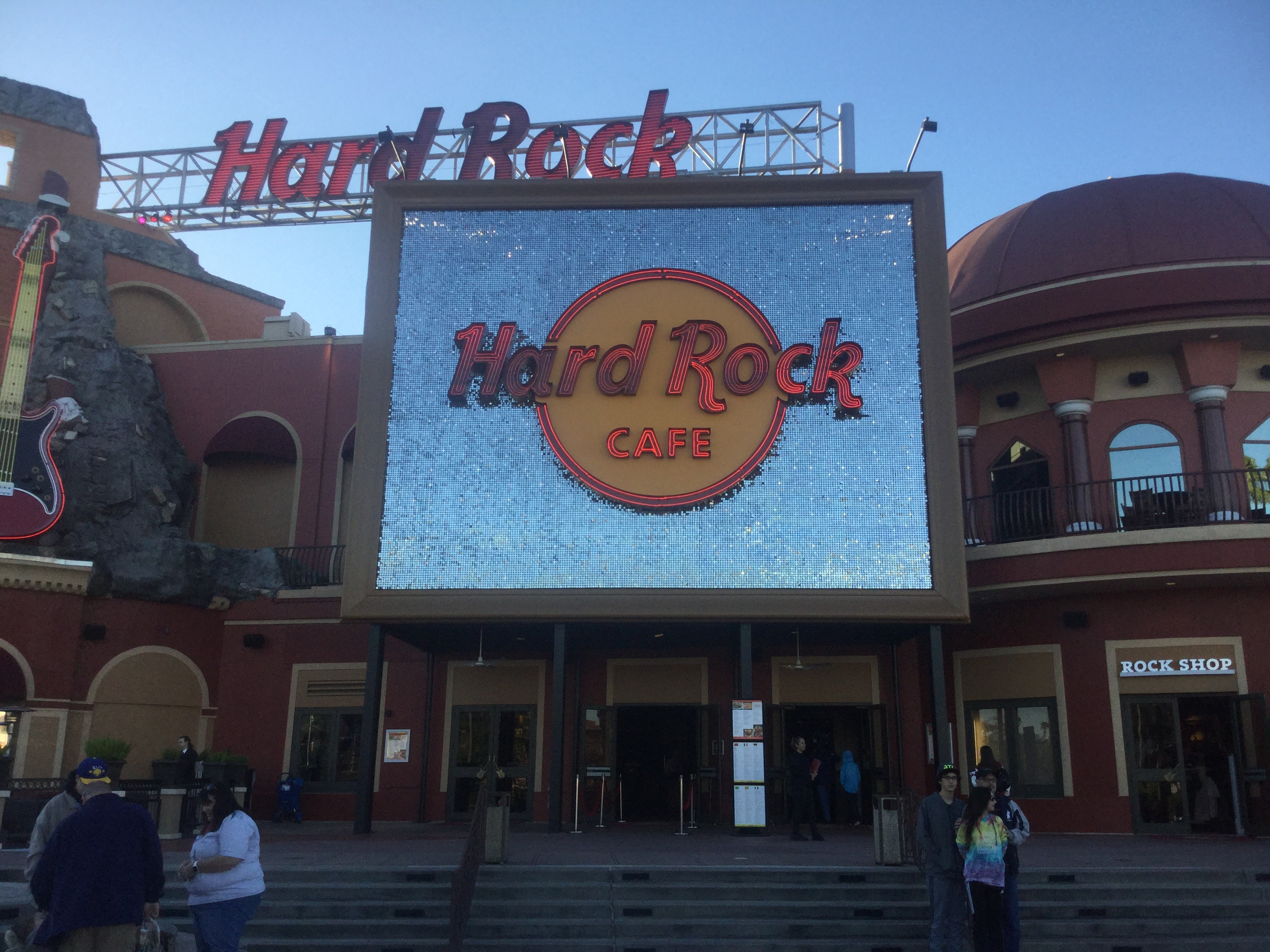
Hard Rock Cafe and Hard Rock Live at Universal CityWalk Orlando

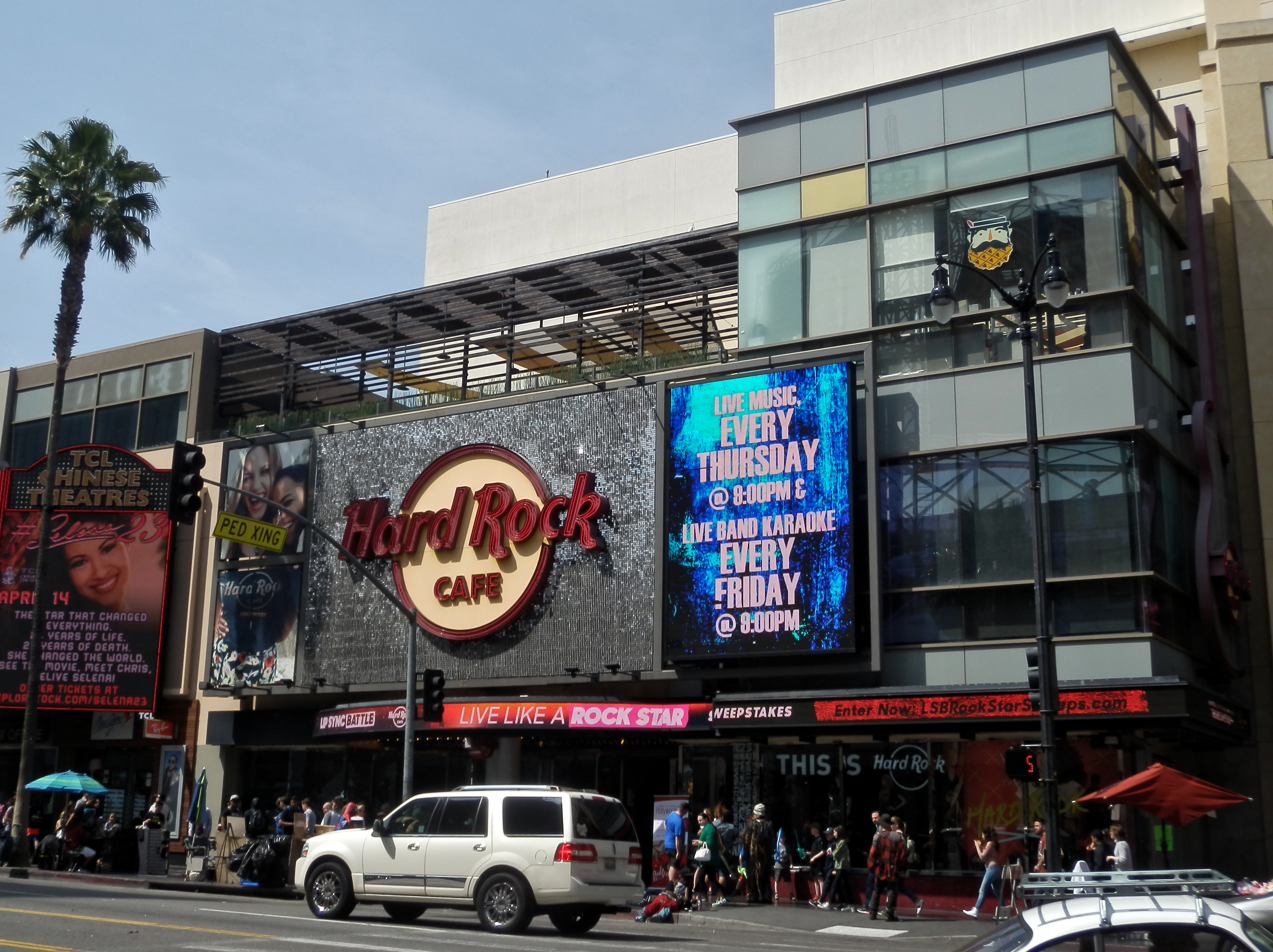
Hard Rock Cafe in Hollywood, Los Angeles

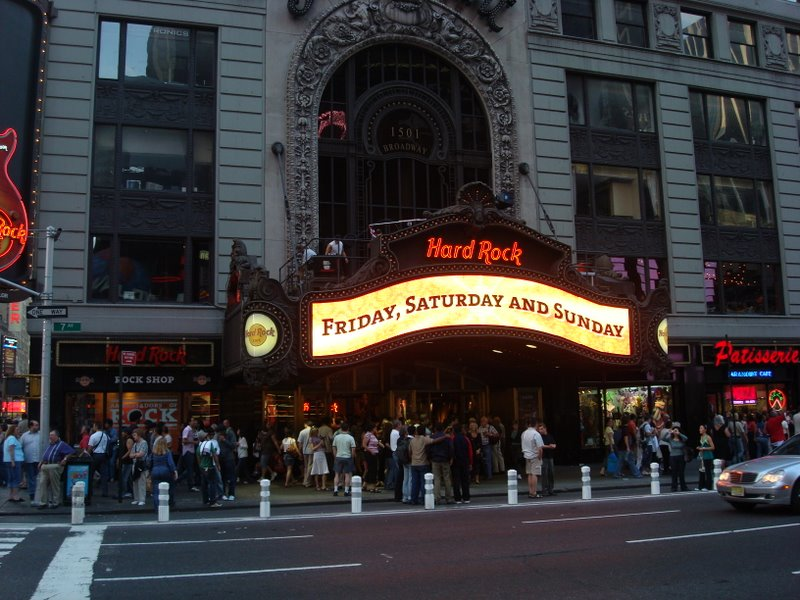
Hard Rock Cafe located on Broadway in the heart of Times Square

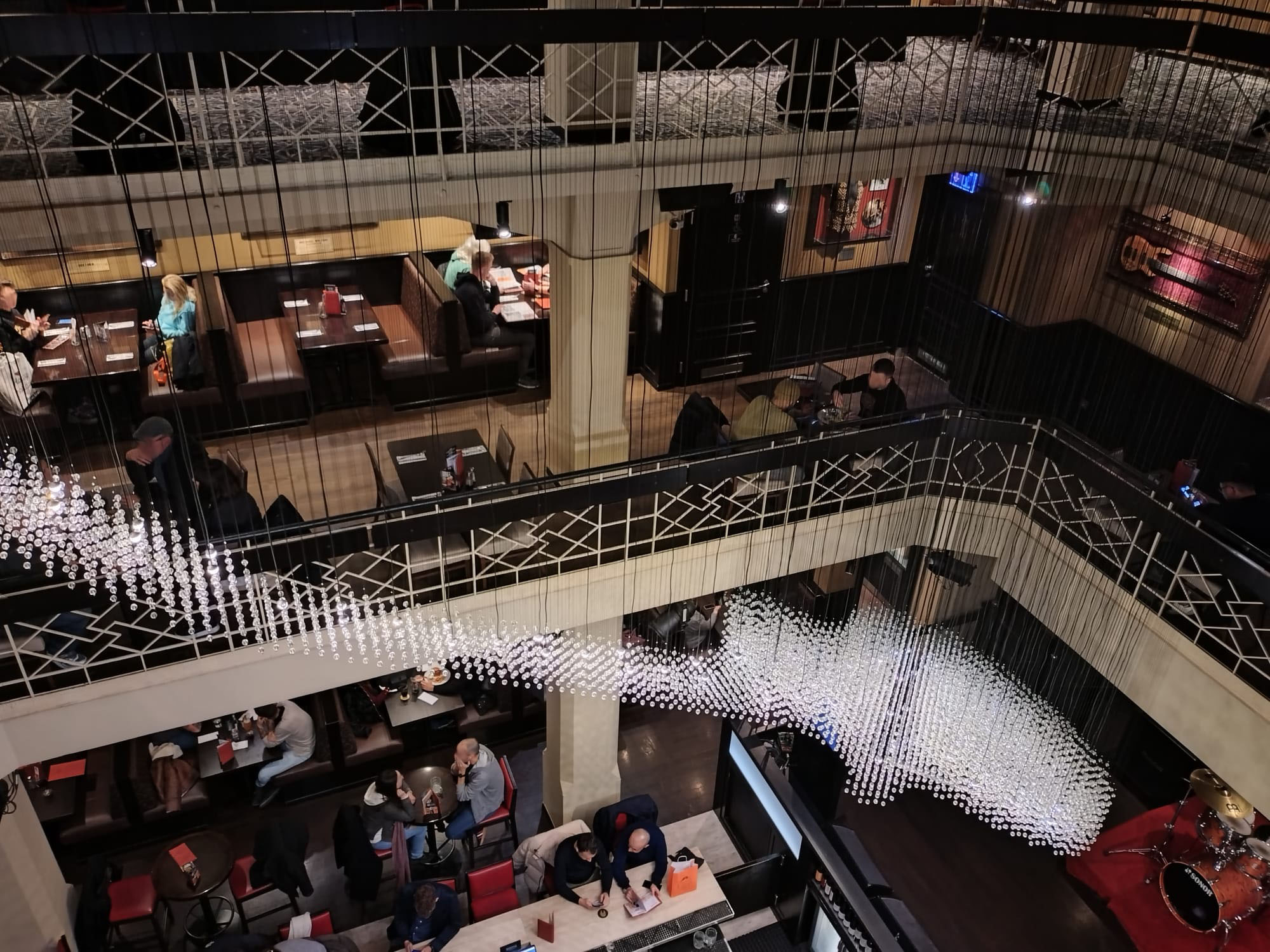
Hard Rock Cafe in Prague

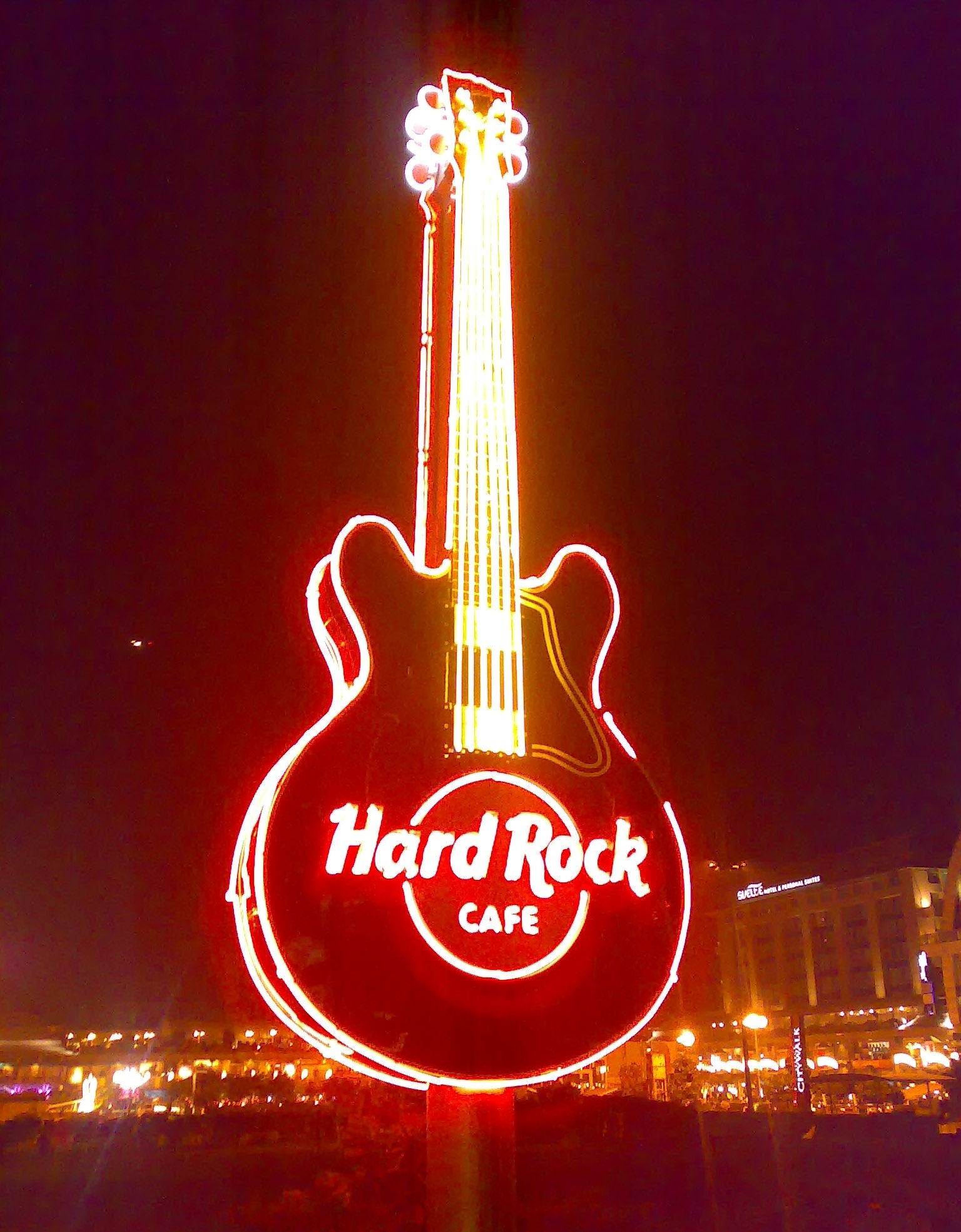
Hard Rock Cafe in New Delhi

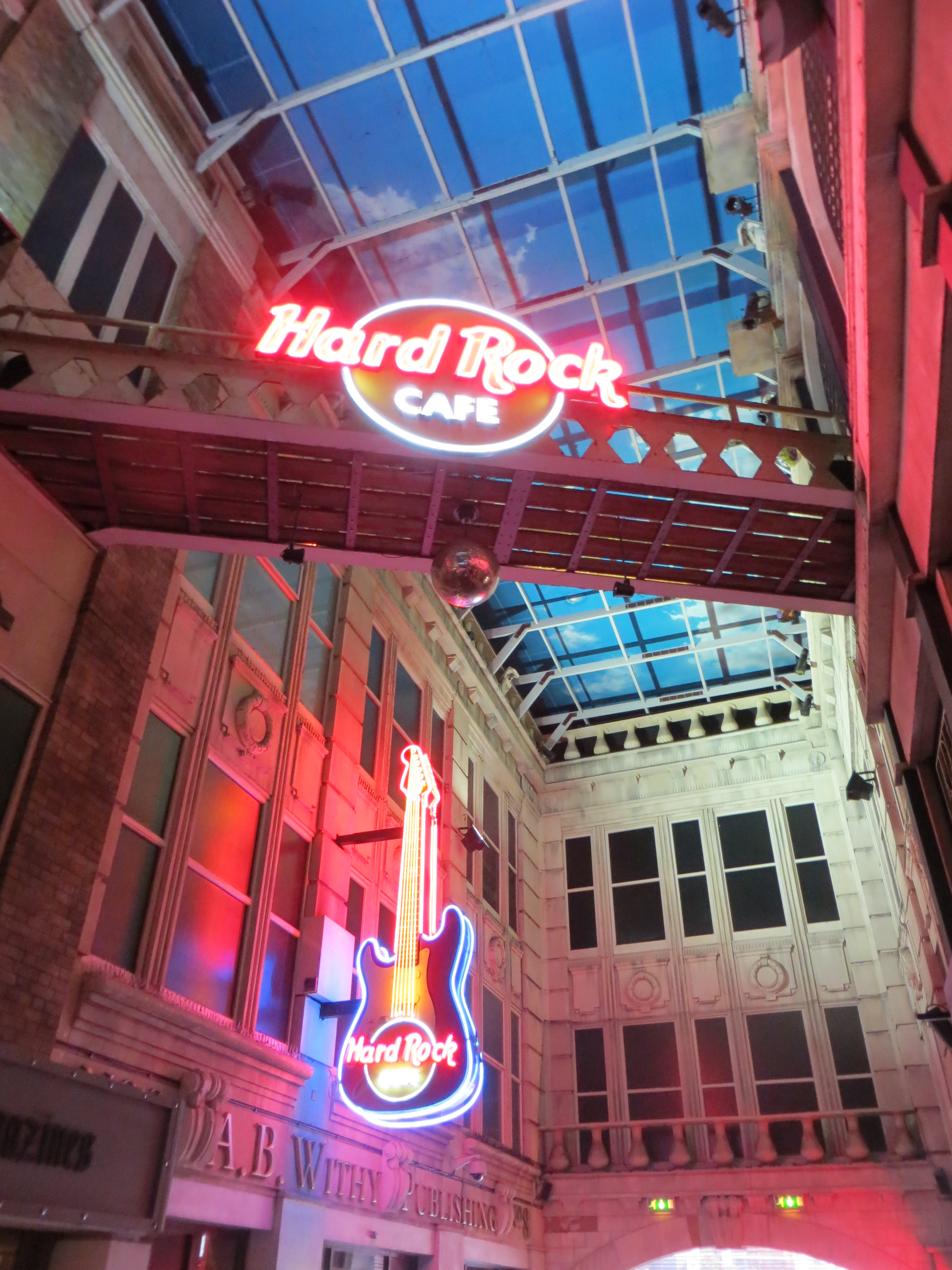
Hard Rock Cafe in Manchester

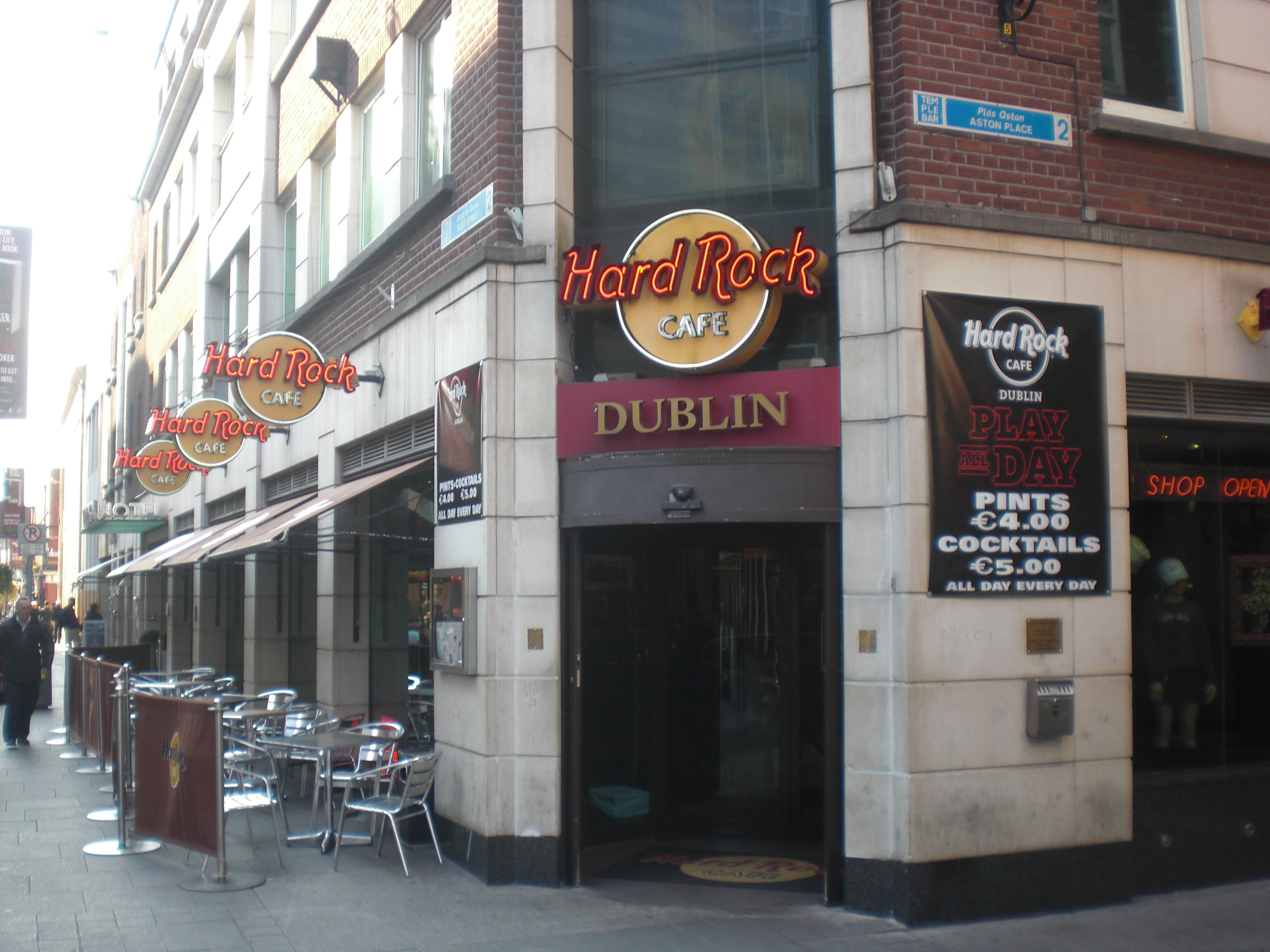
Hard Rock Cafe in Temple Bar, Dublin

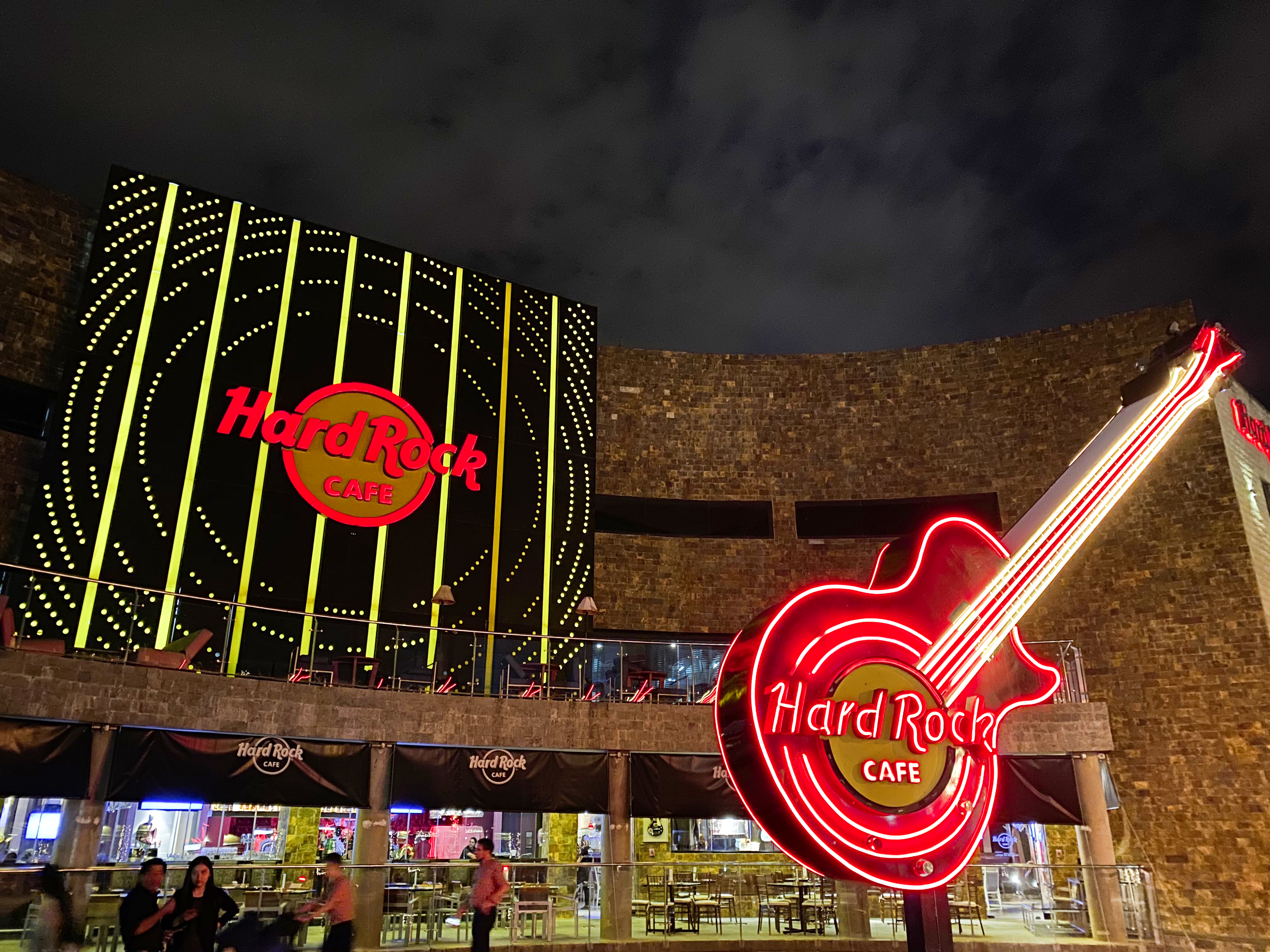
Hard Rock Cafe in Santa Cruz de la Sierra

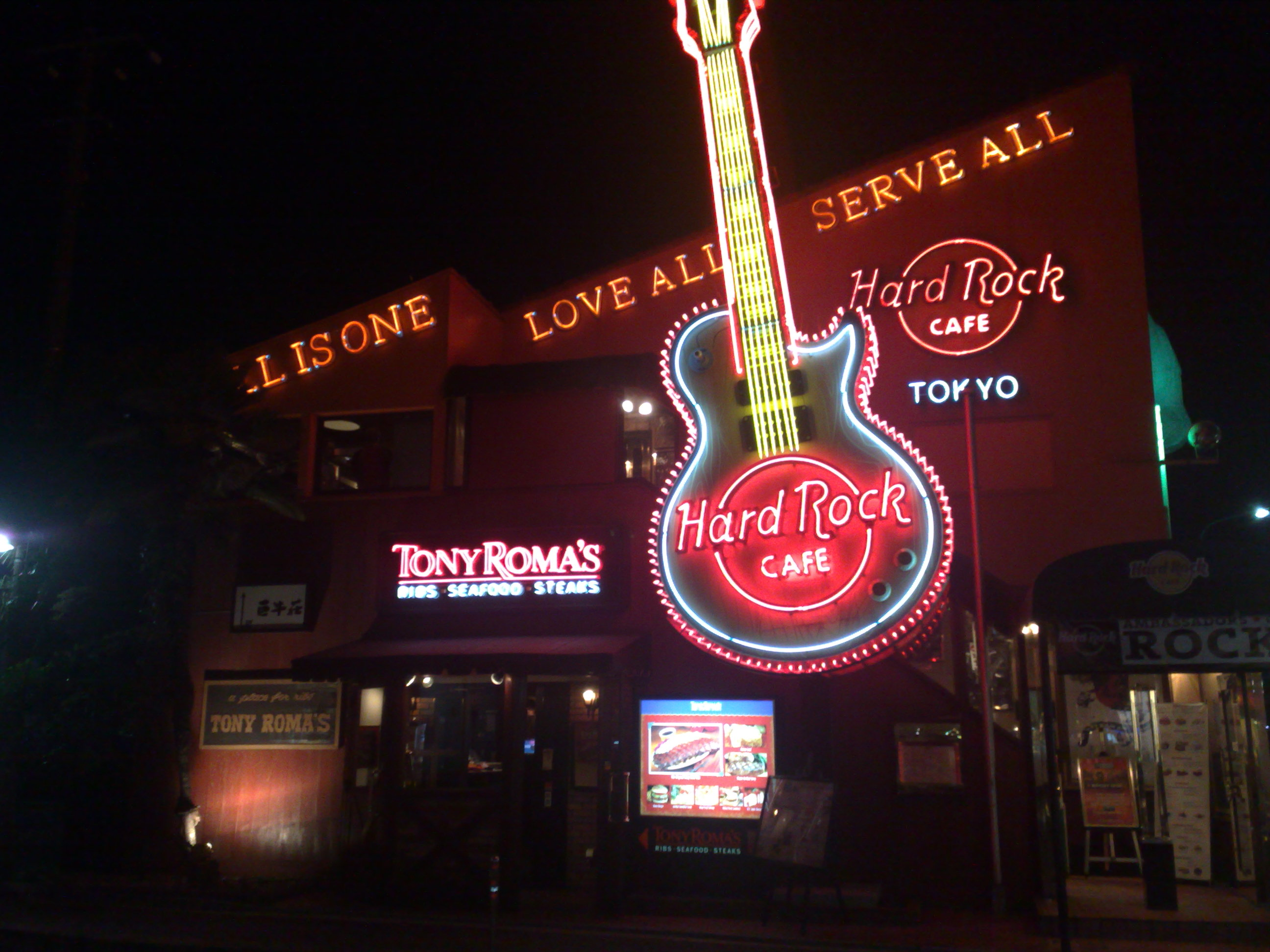
Hard Rock Cafe in Roppongi, Tokyo

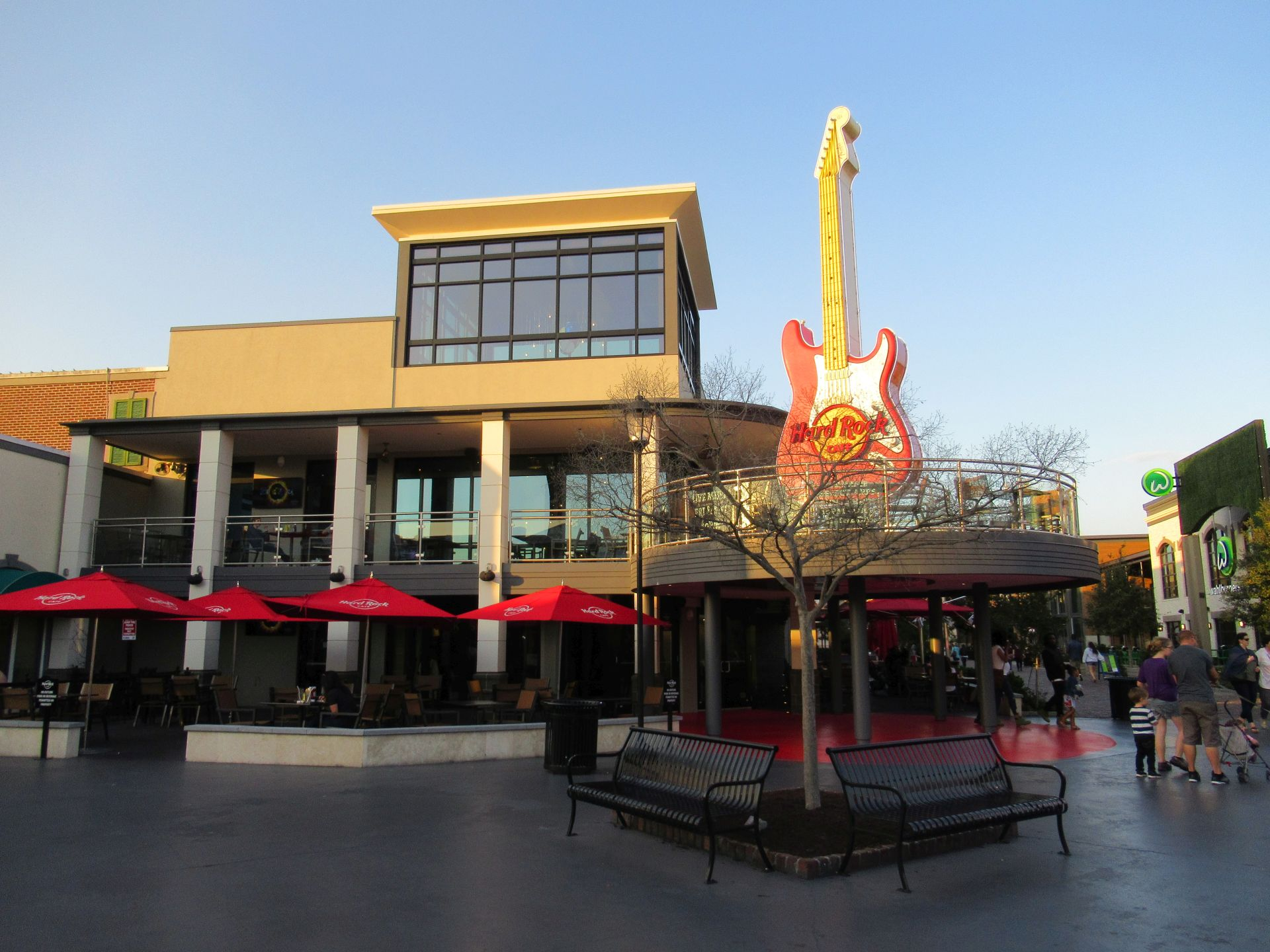
Hard Rock Cafe in Myrtle Beach, South Carolina

== See also ==
- Bubba Gump Shrimp Company
- Fashion Cafe
- Planet Hollywood
- Rainforest Cafe
