= Southern Tide =

American apparel company

- Type: Clothing
- Founded: 2006; 20 years ago
- Founder: Allen Stephenson
- Headquarters: Greenville, South Carolina, U.S.
- Number of locations: 850+
- Products: Men's, Women's and Kid's Apparel and Accessories
- Parent: Oxford Industries
- Website: southerntide.com

Southern Tide is an American apparel company founded in 2006 in Greenville, South Carolina, by Allen Stephenson. The brand is owned by Atlanta-based Oxford Industries.

== History ==
According to Stephenson, the inspiration for Southern Tide came about during college, while studying abroad in Italy. During his senior year at The University of South Carolina, he presented his concept for Southern Tide for a speech class. Following his presentation, Stephenson remembers his professor encouraging him to pursue his idea and he immediately left college. After dropping out, he researched the construction of polo shirts. The finished product became the Southern Tide Skipjack Polo.

== Growth ==
The company's rapid growth has been recognized by several business publications. In 2011, Forbes Magazine recognized Southern Tide in its annual list of "Americas Most Promising Companies", rating the firm at #27. Also that same year, the company was ranked at #73 overall on the Inc. 500 list of "The Fastest Growing American Companies". The magazine further designated Southern Tide to be the 6th fastest growing company in the "products and services" category as well as the fastest growing apparel company. As a trifecta, Southern Tide named the second fastest growing company in the state of South Carolina for 2011 by the Capital Corporation. The following two years (2012, 2013), Southern Tide made the South Carolina Fastest Growing Company list at No. 5.
