= Shaw Industries =

Flooring manufacturer company

Shaw Industries Group, Inc.
- Company type: Subsidiary
- Industry: Textile
- Founded: 1946; 80 years ago
- Headquarters: Dalton, Georgia, United States
- Products: Carpets, Wood Flooring, Resilient Flooring, Laminate, Tile & Stone
- Revenue: US$6 billion
- Owner: Berkshire Hathaway
- Website: shawinc.com

Shaw Industries Group, Inc. is one of the world's largest carpet manufacturers with more than $6 billion in annual revenue and approximately 22,000 employees worldwide. It is headquartered in Dalton, Georgia, and is a wholly owned subsidiary of Berkshire Hathaway.

== History ==
Shaw Industries got its start in 1946 as Star Dye Company, a small business. Clarence Shaw, father of Robert and J.C. Shaw, bought a commission dye company in 1946. Star Dye Company produced bedspreads and scatter rugs. In 1958, Robert Shaw became CEO of the company, which was then jointly owned by the two brothers. With $300,000 in sales, the company expanded dramatically and soon started finishing carpet as Shaw Industries.

In 1967, J.C. Shaw organized a holding company to acquire Philadelphia Carpet Company, founded in 1846. The holding company added Star Finishing to the fold one year later, marking the company's first move into carpet manufacturing. Star Finishing Company then expanded to become the "largest commission finisher of tufted carpet in the world." The holding company went public as Shaw Industries, Inc. in 1971 with approximately $43 million in sales and 900 employees. In 1985, Shaw made its first appearance on the list of America's largest corporations—the Fortune 500—with more than $500 million in sales and close to 5,000 employees. The Shaw Industries Group had four billion in sales as of 1999. The company also merged with Cabin Crafts and Sutton, and Queen Carpets. J. Hicks Lanier is a former director. Queen was founded by Harry Saul, a textile-industry leader whose son, Julian Saul, went on to serve as president of Shaw, retiring in June, 2006.

On January 4, 2001, under the guidance of CEO and President W. Norris Little Sr. and CEO Bob Shaw, Shaw Industries was sold to Berkshire Hathaway Inc., the holding company of Warren E. Buffett. Today, with the leadership of Tim Baucom, CEO, Shaw has $6 billion in annual sales and approximately 22,000 employees. In 2016, Shaw acquired competitor USFloors.
