= Oxford Industries =

American high-end clothing company

Oxford Industries, Inc.
- Type: Public
- Traded as: NYSE: OXM
- Industry: Textile, Apparel Clothing
- Founded: 1942
- Headquarters: Atlanta, Georgia, U.S.
- Key people: Thomas C. Chubb III, CEO
- Products: Clothing, footwear
- Brands: Tommy Bahama; Lilly Pulitzer; Johnny Was; Southern Tide; The Beaufort Bonnet Company; Duck Head; Jack Rogers
- Revenue: ▲US $1.57 billion (2024)
- Operating income: ▲US $194.59 million (2024)
- Net income: ▲US $60.70 million (2024)
- Website: www.oxfordinc.com

Oxford Industries, Inc. is a publicly traded clothing company in the United States that specializes in high-end clothing and apparel. The company carries many major labels, including Tommy Bahama, Lilly Pulitzer, Johnny Was and Southern Tide.

== History ==
Oxford Industries was founded in 1942, when Sartain, Hicks and Thomas Lanier purchased the Oxford Manufacturing Company, a manufacturer of military uniforms. Oxford Industries joined the New York Stock Exchange in the 1960s. Sartain Lanier served as chairman of the board and CEO until his retirement in 1981, when his son J. Hicks Lanier became chairman and CEO.

== Present ==
Today, the company has sales in excess of $1 billion and employs over 6,000 people. It has many major sales offices outside of its headquarters in Atlanta, including those in New York City, Seattle, and Hong Kong.
