= Tommy Bahama =

American clothing manufacturer

- Tommy Bahama located at Bridgeport Village - Tualatin, Oregon
- Type: Subsidiary
- Industry: Fashion, lifestyle, hospitality
- Founded: August 1993
- Headquarters: Seattle, Washington, United States
- Number of locations: 160 (May 2026)
- Area served: International
- Key people: Tony Margolis, Bob Emfield
- Products: Sportswear; activewear; denim; swimwear; watches; footwear; home furnishings
- Brands: Tommy Jeans, Indigo Blues
- Parent: Oxford Industries
- Divisions: Tommy Bahamas Restaurant and Bars
- Website: www.tommybahama.com

Tommy Bahama Group Inc. trading as Tommy Bahama, owned by parent company Oxford Industries is an American multinational lifestyle brand, manufacturer of casual men's and women's sportswear and activewear, denim, swimwear, accessories, footwear and a complete home furnishings collection. Tommy Bahama is available at US department stores including Macy's, Nordstrom, Dillard's, Neiman Marcus, Saks Fifth Avenue, Lord & Taylor, Belk and Von Maur, along with resort locations around the world. There are over 160 company-owned Tommy Bahama retail stores worldwide, 14 of which include a Tommy Bahama restaurant and bar.

== History ==
Tony Margolis, Bob Emfield, and their wives dreamed up the idea of "Tommy Bahama", a lifestyle of never leaving the beach. In 1991, Tony and Bob discussed their concept with Lucio Dalla Gasperina. From the outset, the three envisioned the kind of upscale casual apparel Tommy would wear: printed silk shirts and tailored pants for island living. Basing clothing on the concept, they founded Tommy Bahama Group, Inc. in 1993. The first retaill store opened in Naples, Florida in 1996. The first five stores also had restaurants attached, and as of 2026, Tommy Bahama has 29 restaurants. In 2003, Tommy Bahama Group became fully owned by Oxford Industries, Inc.

== Products ==
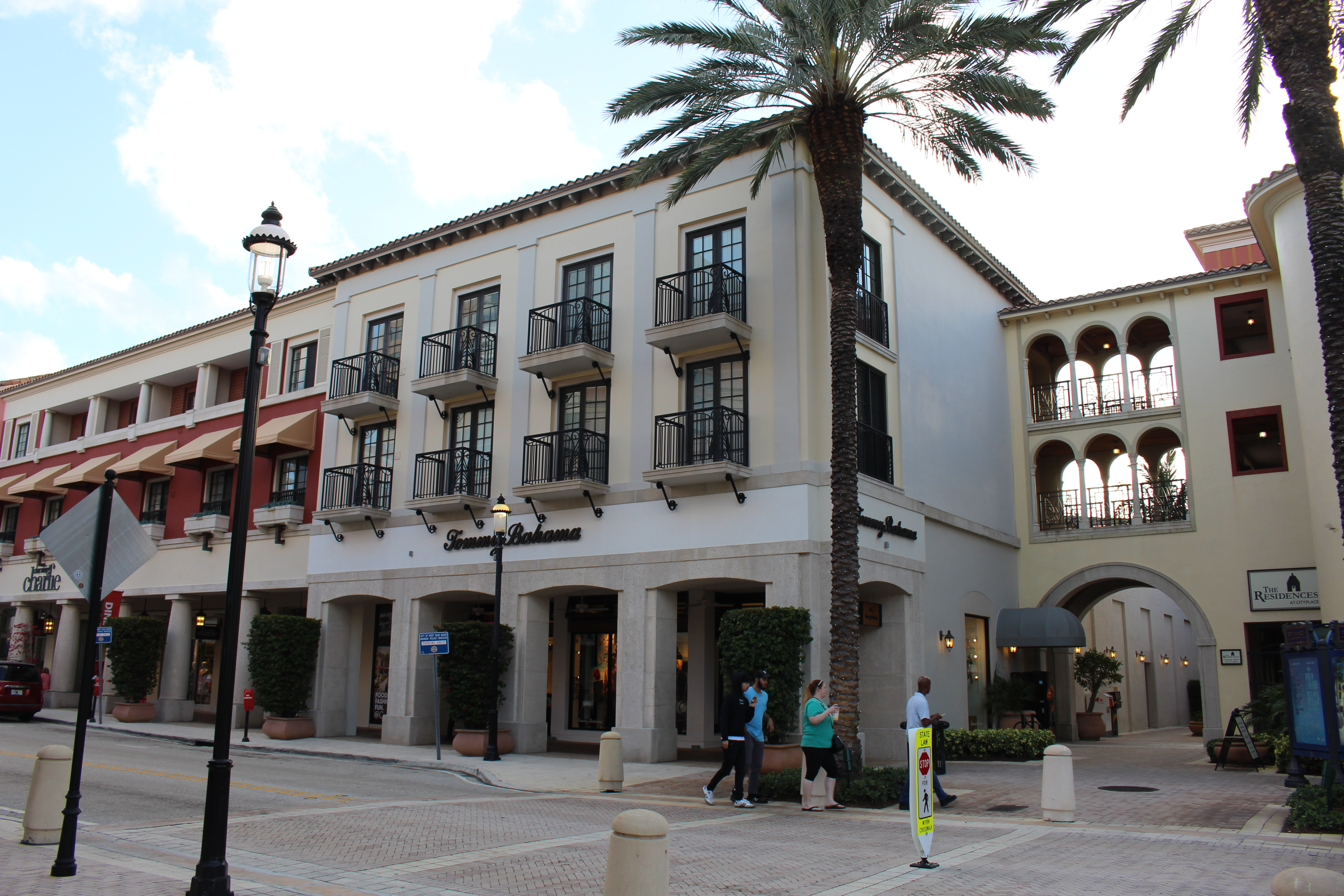
Tommy Bahama store at The Square, West Palm Beach, Florida

The men's sportswear line includes Tommy Bahama Collection, Tommy Bahama Relax, Tommy Bahama IslandActive, and Tommy Bahama Denim; Women's products include sportswear, denim, and swimwear. In addition to company manufactured offering of sportswear, they license home indoor and outdoor furnishings, eyewear, watches, umbrellas, luggage, hats, and men's and women's fragrances. The brand also licenses international companies to manufacture sportswear and operate Tommy Bahama's retail locations in Canada, Hong Kong, Macau, Singapore, Japan, United Arab Emirates and Australia.

Airstream also manufactures a Class B RV based on a Mercedes-Benz Sprinter chassis in a "Tommy Bahama Resort Edition", with 4 different models.

== Liquor range ==
Tommy Bahama launched its own brand of rum in 2007. The line includes two varieties, White Sand, a light rum; and Golden Sun, an aged, dark rum. Both varieties are produced by R.L. Seale Distillery, which has been producing rum for more than 80 years in Barbados.

Tommy Bahama Rum was awarded the Double Gold for Tommy Bahama Golden Sun and Gold for Tommy Bahama White Sands at the 2010 San Francisco World Spirits Competition. As of October 2012, liquor ratings aggregator Proof66.com placed the White Sand and Golden Sun rums in its "Tier 1" category, indicating the "Highest Recommendation."

== Resort ==
In 2023, the brand opened its first resort, the Tommy Bahama Miramonte Resort & Spa, in partnership with CoralTree Hospitality, and the real estate investment company Lowe who first acquired the site in 2020. The 215-room property, which first opened in 1963, underwent a $20 million renovation and features decor inspired by the brand including woven textures and tropical prints.

== Headquarters ==
The corporate headquarters of Tommy Bahama is located at 400 Fairview in the South Lake Union neighborhood of Seattle, Washington, and was built in 2015.
