= List of storms named Dora =

The name Dora has been used for fifteen tropical cyclones: two in the Atlantic Ocean, eight in the East Pacific Ocean, one in the West Pacific Ocean, (Note: This total excludes two storms named Dora that crossed into the West Pacific from the East Pacific.) two in the South-West Indian Ocean, and two in the Australian region.

In the Atlantic:

- Tropical Storm Dora (1956) – caused 27 deaths in Mexico
- Hurricane Dora (1964) – a Category 4 hurricane that became the only hurricane to make landfall in Florida's First Coast in the 20th century

After the 1964 season, the name Dora was retired from the Atlantic naming lists. It was replaced with Dolly.

In the East Pacific:

- Hurricane Dora (1981) – a Category 1 hurricane that did not affect land
- Tropical Storm Dora (1987) – affected Socorro Island
- Hurricane Dora (1993) – a Category 4 hurricane that did not affect land
- Hurricane Dora (1999) (T9911, 07E) – a Category 4 hurricane that crossed into the Central Pacific and West Pacific
- Tropical Storm Dora (2005) – affected Southwestern Mexico
- Hurricane Dora (2011) – a Category 4 hurricane that affected Southwestern Mexico, the Baja California peninsula, and the Southwestern United States
- Hurricane Dora (2017) – a Category 2 hurricane that affected Southwestern Mexico
- Hurricane Dora (2023) (T2308, 05E) – a Category 4 hurricane that crossed into the Central Pacific and West Pacific; helped fuel the 2023 Hawaii wildfires

After the 2023 season, the name Dora was retired from the East Pacific naming lists. It was replaced with Debora.

In the West Pacific:

- Typhoon Dora (1947) (T4719) – a Category 3 typhoon

In the South-West Indian:

- Tropical Depression Dora (1979)
- Cyclone Dora (2007) – an intense tropical cyclone that affected Rodrigues

In the Australian region:

- Cyclone Dora (1964)
- Cyclone Dora (1971) – a Category 1 tropical cyclone

After the 1970–71 season, the name Dora was retired from the Australian region naming lists.
