= Kwak (surname) =

- Hangul: 곽
- Hanja: 郭
- RR: Gwak
- MR: Kwak
- IPA: /kwak/

Kwak (Korean: 곽; Hanja: 郭) is a Korean surname.

== Overview ==
The family name Kwak is written with a hanja meaning "city walls" (郭; 둘레 곽; dulle gwak; also called 외성 곽, oeseong gwak). The same character is also used to write the family names Guō in Mandarin Chinese, Kwok in Cantonese, Kaku in Japanese, and Quach in Vietnamese. The 2000 South Korean census found a total of 187,322 people and 58,396 households with this family name. They identified with a number of different bon-gwan (seat of a clan lineage, for example the residence of an ancestor from whom the clan claims descent):

- Hyeonpung (Dalseong County): 140,283 people and 43,626 households. They claim descent from Gwak Gyeong (곽경; 郭鏡), who came to the Korean Peninsula from Song dynasty China during the reign of Injong of Goryeo (r. 1122–1146). See Hyeonpung Gwak clan.
- Cheongju: 18,218 people and 5,601 households. They claim descent from Gwak Sang (곽상; 郭祥), who served in the civil post of sijung under Heongang of Silla (r. 875–886).
- Seonsan: 5,603 people and 1,743 households
- Gyeongju: 5,086 people and 1,641 households
- 22 bon-gwan each with fewer than 3,000 people: 17,942 people and 5,772 households
- Other or unknown: 190 people and 13 households

In a study by the National Institute of the Korean Language based on 2007 application data for South Korean passports, it was found that 75.4% of people with this family name spelled it in Latin letters as Kwak in their passports, while 14.4% spelled it in Revised Romanization as Gwak, and 5% spelled it Kwag. Rarer alternative spellings (the remaining 5.2%) included Kwack, Gak, Guak, Kwac, Gwag, Kag, Kawk, Koag, Koak, Kweak, and Kwug. Other spellings include Kwalk, Kowalk. Notably, Kwak sounds similar and is spelled similar to Kwok (郭)in Cantonese.

== Notable people ==
=== Athletes ===
- Gwak Hyeon-chae (born 1947), South Korean basketball player
- Riki Choshu (born Kwak Gwang-ung, 1951), Japanese professional wrestler of Korean descent
- Gwak Kyung-keun (born 1972), South Korean football forward
- Kwak Ok-chol (born 1973), North Korean judo athlete
- Gwak Mi-hee (born 1974), South Korean cross-country mountain biker and ski mountaineer
- Kwak Hee-ju (born 1981), South Korean football defender
- Kwak Tae-hwi (born 1981), South Korean football centre-back
- Kwak Dong-hyuk (born 1983), South Korean volleyball player
- Kwak Hyok-ju (born 1984), North Korean boxer
- Kwak Jung-hye (born 1986), South Korean sport shooter
- Kwak Chul-ho (born 1986), South Korean football forward
- Kwak Kwang-seon (born 1986), South Korean football defender
- Kwak Chang-hee (born 1987), South Korean football striker
- Kwak Seung-suk (born 1988), South Korean volleyball player
- Kwak Yoon-gy (born 1989), South Korean short track speed skater
- Kwak Hae-seong (born 1991), South Korean football full-back
- Gwak Dong-han (born 1992), South Korean judo athlete
- Kwak Ye-ji (born 1992), South Korean archer
- Kwak Min-jeong (born 1994), South Korean figure skater
- Gwak Been (born 1999), South Korean baseball pitcher
- Kwak Dae-sung, South Korean judo athlete

=== Film directors ===
- Kwak Ji-kyoon (1954–2010), South Korean film director
- Kwak Jae-yong (born 1959), South Korean film director
- Kwak Kyung-taek (born 1966), South Korean film director
- Kwak Sin-ae (born 1968), South Korean film producer

=== Entertainers ===
- Aaron Kwak (born 1993), American singer, former member of boy band NU'EST
- Kwak Do-won (born 1974), South Korean actor
- Kwak Dong-yeon (born 1997), South Korean actor and singer
- Kwak Hee-sung (born 1990), South Korean actor
- Shin Hyun-been (born Kwak Hyun-been, 1986), South Korean actress
- Kwak Hyun-hwa (born 1981), South Korean actress, comedian and singer
- Kwak Ji-min (born 1985), South Korean actress
- Kwak Jin-eon (born 1991), South Korean singer-songwriter
- Kwak Jung-wook (born 1990), South Korean actor
- Kwak Si-yang (born 1987), South Korean actor
- Kwak Soon-ok (1932–2023), Chinese-born South Korean singer
- Kwak Sun-young (born 1983), South Korean actress
- Ji Sung (born Kwak Tae-geun, 1977), South Korean actor

=== Other ===
- Kwak Chaeu (1552–1617), general under Seonjo of Joseon
- Chung Hwan Kwak (born 1936), Unification Church leader
- Kwak Pom-gi (born 1939), North Korean government official
- Kwak Jae-gu (born 1954), South Korean poet
- Kwak Yi-kyong (born 1979), South Korean LGBT rights activist
- Kwak Jaesik (born 1982), South Korean novelist
- Kwak Joon-bin (born 1992), known professionally as Kwaktube, South Korean YouTuber and television personality
- Kwak Jun-hyeok, South Korean associate professor of political science at Korea University
- Kwak Kyung-sup, South Korean professor of electrical engineering at Inha University
- Kwak Seung-Jun, South Korean economist, academic, public policy advisor, and media figure.
- Gwak Bo-seong (known as Bdd), South Korean professional League of Legends player
- Gwak Ha-um, member of South Korean girl group KiiiKiii.
