= Melissa Nobles =

American political scientist (born 1963)

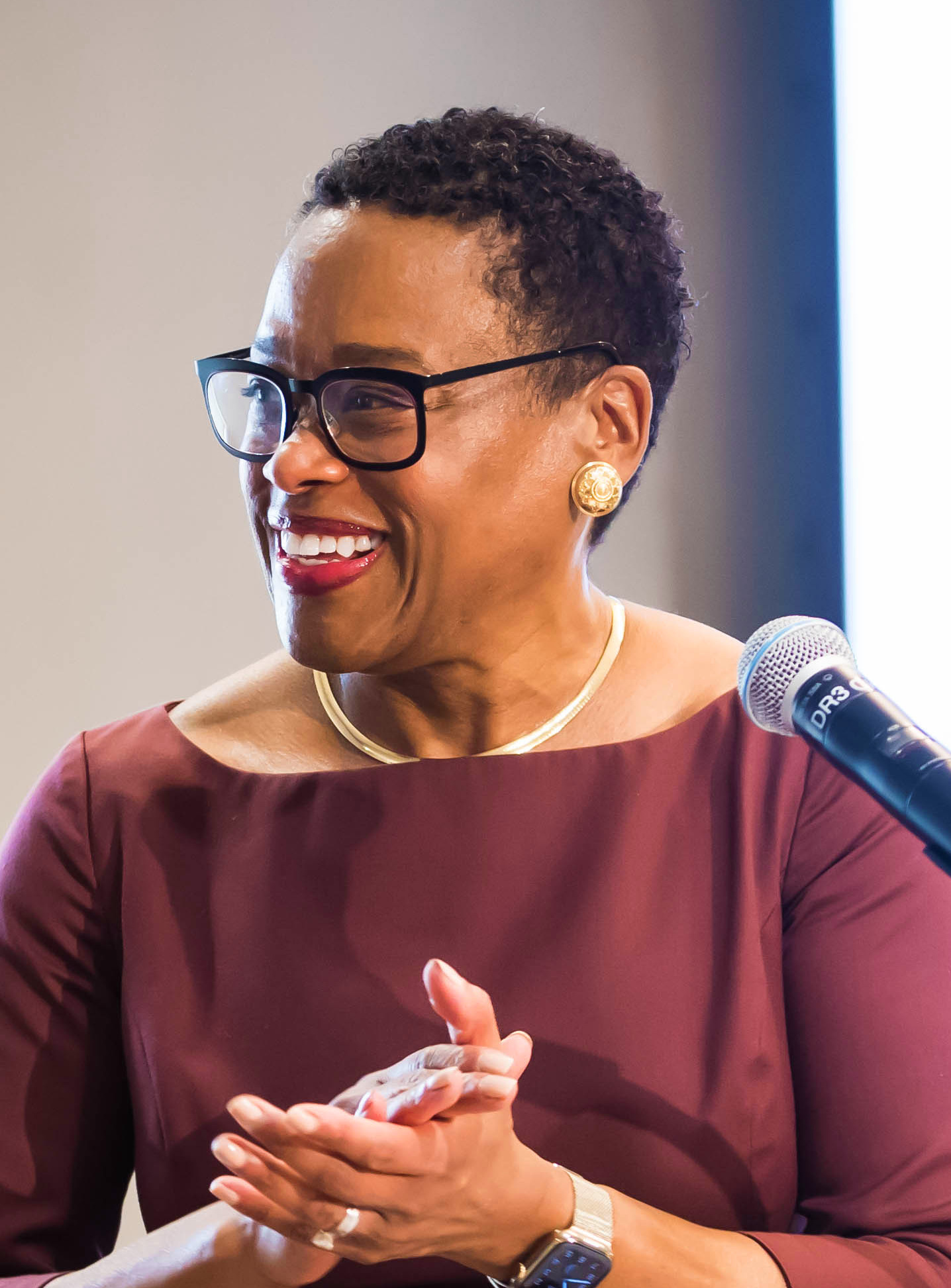
- Nobles in 2024

7th Chancellor of the Massachusetts Institute of Technology
- Incumbent
- Assumed office August 18, 2021
- Preceded by: Cynthia Barnhart

9th Dean of the MIT School of Humanities, Arts, and Social Sciences
- In office 2015–2021
- Preceded by: Deborah Kay Fitzgerald
- Succeeded by: Agustín Rayo

Personal details
- Born: May 13, 1963 (age 63) New York City, New York, U.S.
- Education: Brown University (BA); Yale University (MA, PhD)
- Scientific career
- Fields: Political science
- Workplaces: Massachusetts Institute of Technology
- Thesis: Responding with good sense: the politics of race and censuses in contemporary Brazil (1995)
- Doctoral advisor: James C. Scott

Melissa Nobles (born May 13, 1963) is an American political scientist. Since August 2021, she has served as Massachusetts Institute of Technology's 7th chancellor, the university's top administrator for student life. At MIT, she is also the Class of 1922 Professor of Political Science.

Nobles served as the 9th dean of MIT School of Humanities, Arts, and Social Sciences from 2015 to 2021. Her scholarship focuses on the comparative study of racial politics, categorization, violence, and reconciliation.

== Early life and education ==
Melissa Nobles was born on May 13, 1963 at Sydenham Hospital in Harlem, New York City. Her mother was a social worker while her father worked as a police officer. Nobles' mother and father were raised in South Carolina and Tennessee, respectively; both attended schools that were legally segregated on the basis of race.

Nobles was raised primarily in the Bronx; her family moved to New Rochelle, New York, when she was in junior high. In high school, she was president of her school's Black culture club as well as class president.

Nobles received a Bachelor of Arts with a major in history from Brown University in 1985, as well as a Master of Arts and a Doctor of Philosophy in political science at Yale University in 1995. Her doctoral advisor was James C. Scott. Her doctoral dissertation was titled Responding with good sense: the politics of race and censuses in contemporary Brazil (1995).

== Career ==
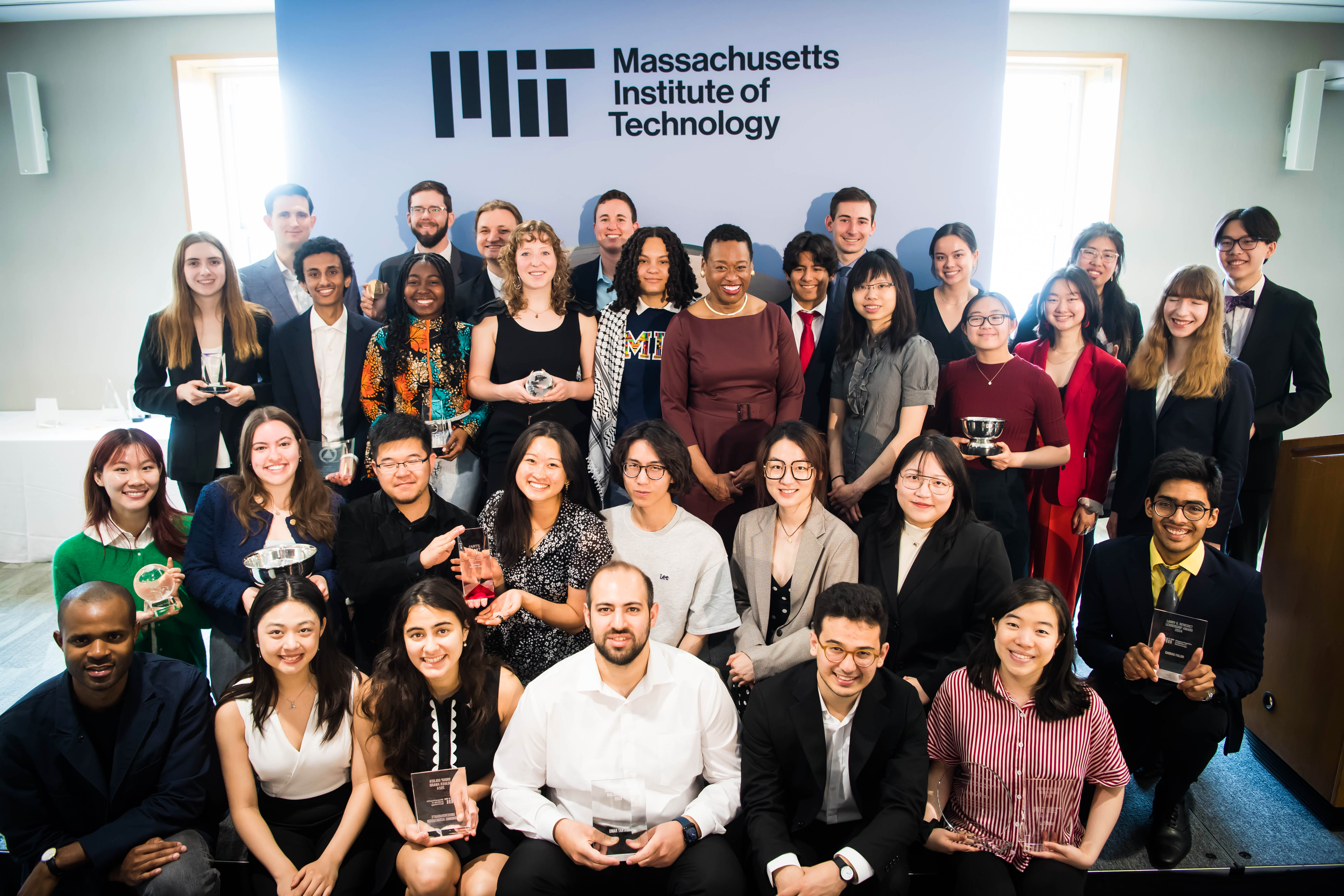
Nobles (center) with MIT Awards Recipients in 2024

After receiving her doctorate, Nobles held fellowships at the Boston University Institute for Race and Social Division and the Harvard Radcliffe Institute.

Nobles joined the faculty of MIT in 1999 as an associate professor of political science. She held the Cecil and Ida Green Career Development Professorship from 1997 to 2000 and was appointed the Arthur and Ruth Sloan Professorship in 2010. Between 2013 and 2015, Nobles headed the university's department of political science. From 2013 to 2014, Nobles was vice-president of the American Political Science Association.

Nobles served as the Kenan Sahin Dean of the MIT School of Humanities, Arts, and Social Sciences from 2015 to 2021, making her the first African American dean in the school's history. She was named MIT's 7th chancellor on June 17, 2021, assuming the office on August 18, 2021.

== Selected works ==
- Nobles, Melissa (2000). Shades of Citizenship: Race and the Census in Modern Politics. Stanford University Press. ISBN 978-0-8047-4059-3.
- Nobles, Melissa (2008). The Politics of Official Apologies. Cambridge University Press. ISBN 978-1-139-46818-3.
- Kwak, Jun-Hyeok; Nobles, Melissa, eds. (2013). Inherited Responsibility and Historical Reconciliation in East Asia. Routledge. ISBN 978-1-135-07305-3.

Academic offices
Preceded by Cynthia Barnhart	7th Chancellor of the Massachusetts Institute of Technology; 2021–present	Incumbent
