= Quach =

Quach (also spelled Quách) is a surname commonly found among Vietnam's Chinese minority. In Japanese, the surname Quach is: Kuoko, Kaku or Kuruwa (くるわ/ かく ) and in Korean: Gwak (곽). The name derives from the Chinese surname 郭, which is pronounced Guō and gwok3 in the dialects of Mandarin and Cantonese respectively. In Hindi, the surname Kak is also similar to the surname Quach.

== History ==
Quach came from the surname Guo which is believed to have originated from Shanxi province of China. Eventually it spread to Chaozhou, also known by its postal spelling of Teochew, a city in the eastern part of China's Guangdong province. 30 percent of Chinese in Vietnam speak the Teochew dialect. Guo was translated into Quach when it arrived to Vietnam. Some people have moved to Malaysia, Thailand, Vietnam, and any southern Asian countries.

=== General Quách Bốc ===
A subordinate of Bỉnh Di named Quách Bốc, just after being informed, led his army battering the Đại Thanh Gate of the citadel down to save his governor. Two brothers, Phạm Du and Phạm Kinh, killed both Bỉnh Di and his son and then escaped out of the citadel with Cao Tông.

=== Chinese ===
This surname is on the 144th place of the Baijiaxing. According to one myth, the people with the surname of the descendants of Xia Yu: Guo Ai /郭哀and Guo Zhi /郭支.

== Middle names ==
Quach kept a book of middle names, spelling out the descendants of the next several dozen generations. The first-born son would look up the name for his generation in the book and name his own first-born son accordingly. The book is in its 26th generation, having been disrupted at least four times since the book's legend by the dislocation of the son who was supposed to continue the naming tradition.

There was a brief Vietnamese dynasty that carried the Quach name.

== Notable individuals ==
- Bao Quach, Vietnamese American mixed martial artist
- Quach My Linh, Vietnamese Hat Vendor https://www.reuters.com/article/idUSKBN21O161/
- Danh Quach (Quách Nhứt Danh) Businessman and one of the Pioneers of Orange County's Little Saigon
- Helen Quach - Australian conductor
- Quách Tĩnh son of Emperor Complaints Guo and Li Binh
