= Alfred O. Hero Jr. =

American political scientist

Alfred Olivier Hero Jr. (February 7, 1924 – January 20, 2006) was an American political scientist.

Hero was born in New Orleans on February 7, 1924, to parents Alfred O. Hero Sr. and Effel A. Pearson. He graduated from the United States Military Academy in 1945 and served with the 309th Infantry Regiment, part of the 78th Infantry Division, until 1948. From 1948 to 1950, he attended Vanderbilt University, earning master's degrees in political science and psychology.

Beginning in 1950, he worked in the Human Research Office of the Assistant Chief of Staff for Personnel, a division of the United States Department of the Army. Hero resigned from the Army in 1953 to pursue a doctorate in international relations at George Washington University. He subsequently worked as an editor for the journal International Organization and served as executive secretary of the World Peace Foundation until 1982. Subsequently, he became a visiting scholar at Harvard University's Center for International Affairs and a visiting professor at the University of Toronto.

Hero and his wife Barbara raised four children, including Alfred O. Hero III. Hero died on January 20, 2006.

== Selected publications ==
- Hero Jr., Alfred O. (1965). The Southerner and World Affairs. Louisiana State University Press. ISBN 9780598252593.
- Hero Jr., Alfred O.; Starr, Emil (1970). The Reuther-Meany Foreign Policy Dispute. Oceana Publications. ISBN 9780379003673.
- Hero Jr., Alfred O. (1973). American Religious Groups View Foreign Policy: Trends in Rank and File Opinion, 1937–1969. Duke University Press. ISBN 9780822302537.
- Fox, Annette Baker; Hero Jr., Alfred O.; Nye, Joseph (1976). Canada and the United States: Transnational and Transgovernmental Relations. Columbia University Press. ISBN 9780231040259.
- Beigie, Carl E.; Hero Jr., Alfred O. (1981). Natural Resources in U.S.-Canadian Relations, Volume I: The Evolution of Policies and Issues. Westview Press. ISBN 9780891585541.
- Hero Jr., Alfred O.; Barratt, John (1981). The American People and South Africa: Publics, Elites, and Policymaking Processes. D. C. Heath. ISBN 9780669043204.
- Hero Jr., Alfred O.; Balthazar, Louis (1988). Contemporary Quebec And The United States, 1960-1985. University Press of America. ISBN 9780819168764.
- Hero Jr., Alfred O. (1995). Louisiana and Quebec: Bilateral Relations and Comparative Socio-Political Evolution, 1673-1993. University Press of America. ISBN 9780819196309.
