= Guo =

- Guo surname in regular script
- Pronunciation: Guō (Mandarin Pinyin); Gwok3 (Cantonese Jyutping); Koeh / Keh; (Hokkien Pe̍h-ōe-jī)
- Language: Chinese, Korean, Japanese, Vietnamese

Origin
- Language: Old Chinese
- Derivation: State of Western Guo
- Meaning: "outer city wall"

Other names
- Variant forms: Kwok, Kwock, Kop, Guok (Cantonese); Guo, Kuo (Mandarin); Kue, Koay, Kwek, Quek, Kwik (Hokkien); Kue, Koay, Quek (Teochew); Kuncoro, Kusuma, Kartono etc. (Indonesia); Kuoch (Cambodian); Quách (Vietnamese); Kwak (Korean); Kaku (Japanese)
- Derivatives: Quách, Kwak

Guo
- Chinese: 郭
Transcriptions
Standard Mandarin
- Hanyu Pinyin: Guō
- Wade–Giles: Kuo^{1}
- IPA: [kwǒ]
Wu
- Romanization: [koʔ^{5}]
Gan
- Romanization: [kuɔʔ^{55}]
Yue: Cantonese
- Jyutping: [gwok^{3}]
Southern Min
- Hokkien POJ: [Koeh]
Middle Chinese
- Middle Chinese: /kwɑk̚/
Old Chinese
- Zhengzhang: /*kʷaːɡ/

"Guo", written in Chinese: 郭, is one of the most common Chinese surnames and means "the wall that surrounds a city" in Chinese. It can also be transliterated as Cok, Gou, Quo, Quach, Quek, Que, Keh, Kuo, Kwo, Kuoch, Kok, Koc, Kwee, Kwek, Kwik, Kwok, Kuok, Kuek, Gock, Koay, or Ker. The Korean equivalent is spelled Kwak; the Vietnamese equivalent is Quách.

The different ways of spelling this surname indicate the origin of the family. For example, the Cantonese "Kwok" originated in Hong Kong and the surrounding area. In the Philippines, the spelling is "Que", "Ke", "Quepe", and "Kepa". In 2019, Guo was the 16th most common surname in mainland China.

== Origins ==
There are eight legendary origins of the Guo surname, which include a Persian (Hui) origin, a Korean origin, and a Mongolian origin, as a result of sinicization. However, the majority of people bearing the surname Guo are descended from the Han Chinese.

=== Hui surname ===
One of the Guo family is from the Hui clans around Quanzhou in Fujian.

Early in the 14th century, a Persian Al-Qudsan Al-Dhaghan Nam (伊本·庫斯·德廣貢·納姆) was sent to Quanzhou by Külüg Khan for assisting grain transportation by sea. He failed to return to Khanbaliq due to war, then got married and settled at Quanzhou. Because his Persian surname Qudsan pronounces similar to Chinese Guo, Al-Qudsan Al-Dhaghan Nam's grandsons began to change their surname to Guo in order to assimilate with local Han Chinese. It was politically expedient to claim they were descendants of Guo Ziyi in order to be better accommodated by local people and later the Ming dynasty government. After Haijin policy applied and the Portuguese began to dominate the China-Middle East maritime trade, they were more localized and recognized as descendants as Guo Ziyi by themselves and by local people.

Due to more people of these clans identifying as Hui, the population of Hui has grown. All these clans needed was evidence of ancestry from Arab, Persian, or other Muslim ancestors to be recognized as Hui, and they did not need to practice Islam. The Communist party and its policies encouraged the definition of Hui as a nationality or ethnicity. The Chinese government's Historic Artifacts Bureau preserved tombs of Arabs and Persians whom Hui are descended from around Quanzhou. Many of these Hui worship their village guardian deities and are non-Muslims; they include Buddhists, Taoists, followers of Chinese Folk Religions, secularists, and Christians. Many clans with thousands of members in numerous villages across Fujian recorded their genealogies and had Muslim ancestry. Hui clans originating in Fujian have a strong sense of unity among their members, despite being scattered across a wide area in Asia, such as Fujian, Taiwan, Singapore, Indonesia, and Philippines.

In Taiwan there are also descendants of Hui who came with Koxinga who no longer observe Islam, the Taiwan branch of the Guo (romanized as Kuo in Taiwan) family are non-Muslims, but maintain a tradition of not offering pork at ancestral shrines. The Chinese Muslim Association counts these people as Muslims. The Taiwanese Guo clan view their Hui identity as irrelevant and don't assert that they are Hui.

Various different accounts are given as to whom the Hui Guo clan is descended from. Several of the Guo claimed descent from Han chinese General Guo Ziyi. They were then distressed and disturbed at the fact that their claim of descent from Guo Ziyi contradicted their being Hui, which required foreign ancestry. The Encyclopædia Iranica claims the ancestor of the Guo clan in Baiqi was the Persian Ebn Tur (Daqqaq).

== Notable people ==
=== Historical ===
- Guo Chongtao, General of the Chinese Five Dynasties and Ten Kingdoms period state Later Tang (and Later Tang's predecessor state Jin)
- Guo Chun, painter during the Early Ming dynasty
- Guo Chuwang, patriot at the end of the Song dynasty
- Guo Daiju, Official and Chancellor of the Tang dynasty
- Guo Huai, Military General of Cao Wei
- Guo Jia, Official and Adviser under Warlord Cao Cao
- Guo Kan, a famed Chinese general that served under the Mongols
- Guo Nuwang, First Empress of Cao Wei
- Guo Pu, writer and scholar of the Eastern Jin
- Guo Rong, Second Emperor of Later Zhou also known as Chai Rong
- Guo Shengtong, First Empress of Emperor Guangwu
- Guo Shoujing, astronomer, engineer, and mathematician who lived during the Yuan dynasty
- Guo Si, General who serve under Warlord Dong Zhuo during the Late Han dynasty
- Guo Tu, adviser under Warlord Yuan Shao
- Guo Wei, Founding Emperor of Later Zhou
- Guo Xi, Chinese Painter of the Song dynasty
- Guo Xiang Taoist of the Early Jin dynasty
- Guo Xun, General of The Han dynasty
- Guo Yuanzhen, General Official and Chancellor of the Tang dynasty
- Guo Zhengyi, Official and Chancellor of the Tang dynasty
- Guo Zhongshu, painter and scholar during the Song dynasty
- Guo Ziyi (697–781), general of Tang China who ended the Anshi Rebellion
- Empress Dowager Guo (d.848), Empress Dowager and Grand Empress Dowager of the Tang dynasty, granddaughter of Guo Ziyi
- Empress Mingyuan (d. 264), Empress of Cao Rui, attempted to prevent Cao Wei from being userped by the Sima family
- Empress Guo (Renzong) (1012–1035), First wife of Emperor Renzong of Song
- Empress Guo (Zhenzong) (c.975 -1007), Empress of Emperor Zhenzong of Song
- Empress Xiaoyuanzhen (1580–1613), Crown Princess of the Taichang Emperor, posthumously promoted as Empress

=== Modern ===
- Terry Gou (郭台銘, born 1950), Taiwanese billionaire, founder and chairman of Foxconn
- Guo Ailun (born 1993), Chinese basketball player
- Frant Gwo or Guo Fan (郭帆, born 1980), Chinese film director
- Guo Guangchang (born 1967), Chinese billionaire, founder and chairman of Fosun International
- Guo Jingjing (born 1981), Chinese Olympic diver
- Guo Jingming (born 1983), Chinese author and pop idol
- Guo Mei (born 1968), Chinese haematologist
- Guo Moruo (1892–1978), Chinese author, poet, historian, archaeologist and government official
- Guo Qi (born 1995), Chinese chess player
- Guo Songtao (1818–1891), Chinese diplomat and statesman during the Qing dynasty
- Guo Wengui (born 1967), Chinese billionaire businessman and political activist
- Guo Wenli (born 1989), Chinese curler
- Guo Xinwa (born 2000), Chinese badminton player
- Guo Ying (born 1991), Chinese singer and rapper, member of girl group Rocket Girls 101
- Guo Yonghuai (1909–1968), aerodynamics expert and a leader of China's atomic and hydrogen bomb projects
- Tina Guo (born 1985), Chinese-American cellist and erhuist
- Xiaolu Guo (born 1973), Chinese-British novelist and filmmaker
- Alice Guo, Filipino-Chinese businesswoman and former mayor of Bamban, Tarlac
- Hean Tat Keh, Professor of Marketing at Monash University
- Herman Keh (born 1996), Singaporean actor and model
- Teresa Kok (born 1964), Malaysian politician
- Kuo Fang-yu (born 1952), Minister of Labor of the Republic of China (2016–2017)
- Kuo Hsing-chun (born 1993), Taiwanese Olympic weightlifter
- Kuo Kuo-wen (born 1967), Deputy Minister of Labor of the Republic of China (2016–2017)
- Kuo Ping-Wen (1880–1969), Chinese educator
- Hong-Chih Kuo (born 1981), Taiwanese baseball pitcher
- Robert Kuok (born 1923), Malaysian born Chinese, Hong Kong billionaire, chairman of Shangri-La Hotels and Resorts
- Phillip Kwok (born 1951) Hong Kong–based Taiwanese actor, martial artist, and stuntman.
- Didik Nini Thowok (born Kwee Tjoen An, 1954), Indonesian actor and performer.
- Kwik Kian Gie (born 1935), Indonesian politician and economist.
- Kwek Leng Beng (born 1940), Singaporean billionaire, executive chairman of Hong Leong Group
- Sherman Kwek (born 1975/76), Singaporean businessman, son of Kwek Leng Beng
- Kwok Wing-kin (born 1986), Hong Kong politician, leader of the Labour Party
- Aaron Kwok (born 1965), Hong Kong singer, dancer, and actor
- Kenix Kwok (born 1969), Hong Kong actress
- Sonija Kwok (born 1974), Hong Kong actress
- Roger Kwok (born 1964), Hong Kong actor
- Walter Kwok (1950–2018), Hong Kong billionaire, former CEO of Sun Hung Kai Properties
- Burt Kwouk (1930–2016), British actor
- Phyllis Quek (born 1973), Malaysian actress based in Singapore
- Sam Quek (born 1988), British field hockey player and gold medal winner at the 2016 Summer Olympics
- Quek Leng Chan (born 1941), Malaysian billionaire, co-founder of Hong Leong Group Malaysia
- Keh Chin Ann (郭振安; born 1974, disappeared in 1986), a twelve-year-old schoolboy who went missing in Singapore
- Guo Jiakun, spokesperson for the Chinese Ministry of Foreign Affairs

== Fictional people ==
- Guo Jing, protagonist in The Legend of the Condor Heroes

== See also ==
- Kwak (surname), the same surname in Korean
- Guo (surname 國), a rarer surname meaning "nation"
