= Victor McElheny =

American science writer and journalist (1935–2025)

- Born: Victor King McElheny; September 8, 1935; Boston, Massachusetts, U.S.
- Died: July 14, 2025 (aged 89)
- Education: Harvard University (AB)
- Occupations: Journalist; author; institution director

Victor King McElheny (September 8, 1935 – July 14, 2025) was an American science writer and journalist, who covered a wide variety of topics, including the Apollo lunar landing program, molecular biology, astronomy, science in Antarctica, and environmental issues. In 1983, McElheny founded the Knight Science Journalism Fellowship Program at the Massachusetts Institute of Technology to support science journalists.

== Life and career ==
From ages 14 to 17, he was a student at Phillips Exeter Academy, where he was the president of his class for the academic year 1952–1953 and wrote for The Exonian. As an undergraduate at Harvard University from 1954 to 1957, McElheny graduated with a bachelor's degree in Social Relations and wrote for The Harvard Crimson. From 1957 to 1958, he was in the U.S. Army, first in the U.S. Army Reserve in Fort Jackson, S.C. and then at the U.S. Army Information School in Fort Slocum, N.Y. McElheny contributed many articles on science to newspapers and magazines and was a journalist employed by The Charlotte Observer, Science 80-86, The Boston Globe, and The New York Times. He wrote for television and made appearances on television. For the academic year 1962–1963 he was a Nieman Fellow. From 1972 to 1973 he worked for the Polaroid Corporation as a consultant and historian, describing the SX-70 integral instant color photography system and preparing reports on automation study. From 1973 to 1978, he wrote a weekly column on technology for The New York Times.

As a Nieman Fellow in 1962–1963, McElheny first met James D. Watson. The day after Watson received word from Stockholm that he would share in that year's Nobel Prize in Physiology or Medicine, he lectured in George Wald’s Natural Sciences 5 class about modern biology. McElheny happened to be in the front row. The occasion is described on pages 1 through 4 of McElheny's Watson and DNA: Making a Scientific Revolution, Perseus 2003 and paperback 2004. During his Nieman Fellowship year, McElheny did not attempt to interview Watson but did meet him several times at conferences in Europe while covering research and science policy there for Science magazine.

The close acquaintance between McElheny and Watson, began at an early 1967 ceremony awarding the Rumford Premium of the American Academy of Arts and Sciences to Princeton astrophysicist Robert H. Dicke, where Watson told McElheny of discoveries in the field of “repressor” proteins in his Harvard lab. McElheny did a story on this work by Walter Gilbert and Mark Ptashne for The Boston Globe early in 1967, and then did frequent stories on molecular biology, including a full page in The Boston Globe's Sunday edition about the June 1968 Symposium at Cold Spring Harbor Laboratory (CSHL). This was just after Watson became CSHL director almost simultaneously with publication of The Double Helix and his marriage to Elizabeth "Liz" Lewis. McElheny attended the literary lunch at the Century Association in New York City for The Double Helix, and a rock and roll party at Jim Watson's Cambridge, Massachusetts, home that in effect celebrated his engagement, and McElheny lunched with Jim and Liz shortly after their wedding. McElheny was several times at Cold Spring Harbor for scientific meetings and meals at the Watsons’ home, and chaired public policy sessions at a 1976 conference on environmental sources of cancer.

In 1978, McElheny left The New York Times after five years as the paper's technology specialist to join Cold Spring Harbor Laboratory as first director of the Banbury Center. He was charged with organizing approximately 20 conferences on environmental health risks, and publishing (as the chief editor) 12 books from the conferences. He worked under Watson's supervision for four years. In subsequent years, McElheny visited Cold Spring Harbor many times, particularly to do research for his 2003 biography Watson and DNA: Making a Scientific Revolution and also to gather material for his 2010 history of the Human Genome Project for Basic Books. Victor McElheny and his wife Ruth attended celebrations of the 50th anniversary of the double helix at the Waldorf Astoria New York in 2003, Watson's 80th birthday in 2008, and his 90th in 2018.

In 1982 McElheny joined MIT to create a fellowships program with funding from the Sloan Foundation and the Mellon Foundation; the fellowships program (MIT Knight Science Journal Fellowships) is administered by the Program in Science, Technology, and Society and was headed by McElheny from 1982 to 1998. As first director of what became the Knight Science Journalism program, he oversaw the program's permanent endowment through donations of $8.25 million over eight years from the Knight Foundation, supplemented by $2.5 million from other MIT donors to match the $5 million Knight endowment challenge. He was until his death a Research Affiliate at MIT's Program in Science, Technology, and Society. As of 2019, the endowed MIT program for science journalists was in its 37th year. Victor McElheny and his wife Ruth, along with a grant from the Rita Allen Foundation, funded MIT's Victor K. McElheny Award.

Victor McElheny and Brenda Maddox were panelists at a 2003 symposium at the Centre for Life in Newcastle upon Tyne, England. Her widely acclaimed book Rosalind Franklin: The Dark Lady of DNA had just appeared. According to Hilary Rose, Watson in his book The Double Helix "systematically stereotyped Franklin, making her out to be a bluestocking and a frump" and "this stereotyping enabled him to erase Franklin's crucial contribution of the X-ray photographs that confirmed the helical structure." McElheny met Hilary Rose and her husband Steven in London in the 1960s and greatly enjoyed conversations in which McElheny's political differences with Hilary and Steven Rose were major. In his famous book, Watson, taking the part of Maurice Wilkins (who might have been a distant relative of Crick's because Crick's mother's maiden name was Wilkins), took adolescent swipes at Rosalind Franklin in a book that was both designedly and inevitably indiscreet and adolescent. As usual in the real events forming the basis of history, the actuality is a bit embarrassing. However, Watson's The Double Helix conferred deserved and lasting fame on Franklin.

In addition to his long acquaintanceship with Watson, McElheny, starting from the time when he worked for the Polaroid Corporation in 1972–1973, was personally acquainted with Polaroid's genius innovator Edwin H. Land for many years. Land died in 1991 and McElheny completed his biography of Land in 1998.

In the later years of the decade of the 2010s, McElheny pursued his interest in "forced-draft national technological mobilizations, of the sort that would be needed to accelerate efforts to forestall at least some of the damage from global warming."

McElheny died on July 14, 2025, at the age of 89.

In May 2026, MIT honored McElheny by hosting a Victor McElheny Luncheon and Panel Discussion on the 25th Anniversary of the Human Genome Project, where colleagues and fellowship alumni reflected on McElheny's life and legacy. Taking place at MIT’s Samberg Center, the Victor McElheny Luncheon tribute speakers included Usha Lee McFarling, Agustín Rayo, Boyce Rensberger, Deborah Fitzgerald, Wade Roush, David Mindell, David Ansley, and David Kaiser. The Panel Discussion on the 25th Anniversary of the Human Genome Project panel featured Christopher Donohue, Lauren Linton, Alicia Martin, and Daphne Oluwaseun Martschenko, moderated by Megan Molteni.

== Selected publications ==
- Insisting on the Impossible: The Life of Edwin Land. Reading, Mass: Perseus Books. 1998.
- Watson and DNA: Making a Scientific Revolution. New York: Perseus Books. 2003. 2004 pbk edition. Basic Books. February 5, 2004. ISBN 9780738208664. (See DNA.)
- Drawing the Map of Life: Inside the Human Genome Project. New York: Basic Books. 2010. McElheny, Viktor K. (July 31, 2012). 2012 pbk edition. Basic Books. ISBN 9780465032600.
