= Kwak Jun-hyeok =

South Korean political philosopher and academic

Jun-hyeok Kwak
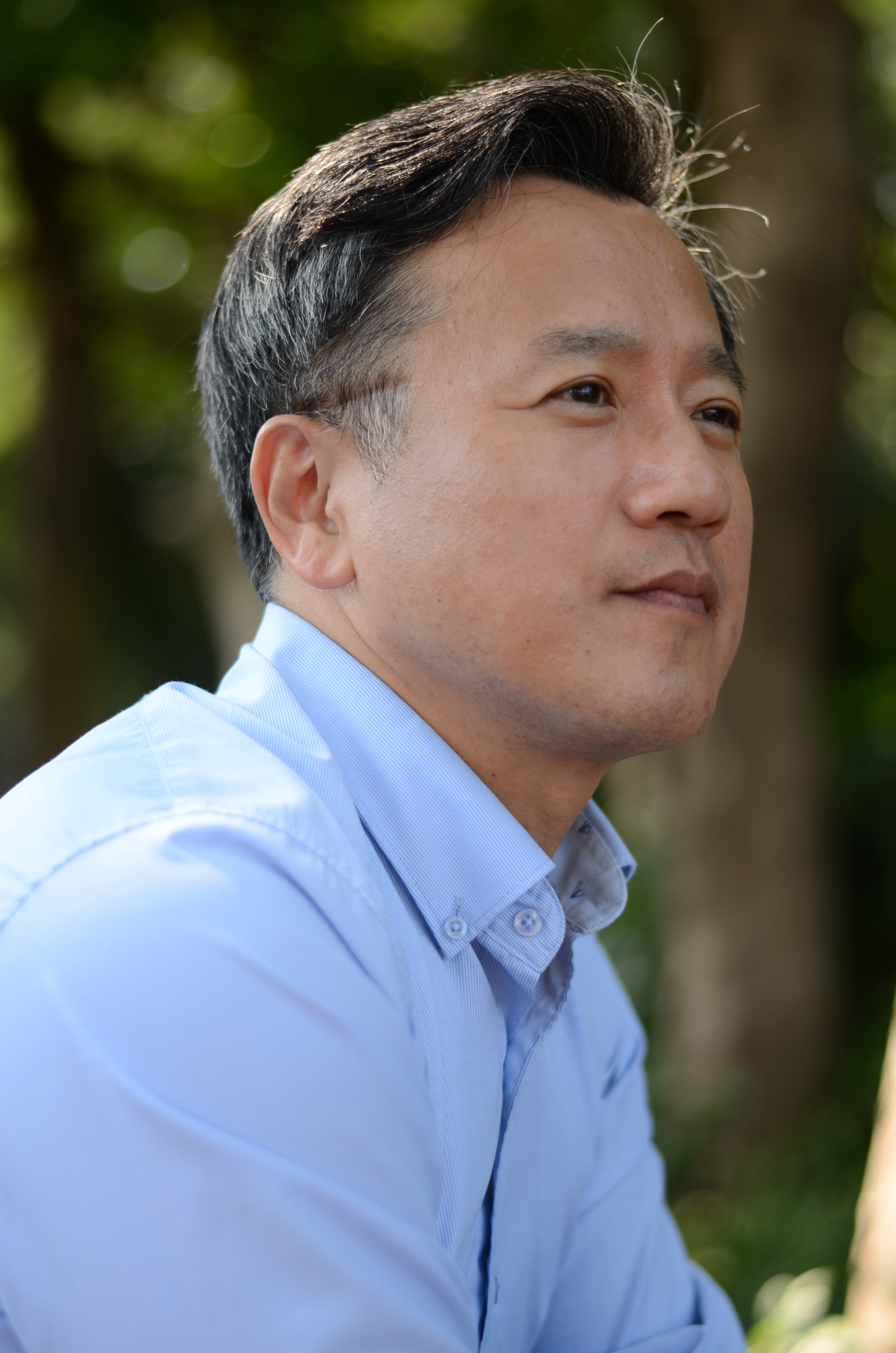

Philosophical work
- Era: Contemporary philosophy
- Region: Western philosophy
- School: Liberal Republicanism
- Institutions: Department of Philosophy (Zhuhai), Sun Yat-sen University
- Main interests: Western Political Philosophy, Contemporary Political Theory, Republicanism, Nationalism, Patriotism, Global Justice
- Notable ideas: Reciprocal Non-domination

- Kwak Jun-hyeok
- Hangul: 곽준혁
- RR: Gwak Junhyeok
- MR: Kwak Chunhyŏk

Jun-Hyeok Kwak (Note: In this Korean name, the family name is Kwak.) is a South Korean political philosopher, professor and Yixian (逸仙) Scholar of Philosophy (Zhuhai Campus) at Sun Yat-sen University, China, where he is also serving as the head of political philosophy and ethics. He received his Ph.D. from the University of Chicago in 2002. Before joining Sun Yat-sen University, he taught at various universities including Korea University and Kyungpook National University. His research interests lie at the crossroads of Western political philosophy, contemporary political theory, and comparative philosophy. He has been widely known as a republican theorist of ‘reciprocal non-domination.’ Currently, he is serving as General Editor of the Routledge Series of Political Theories in East Asian Context and co-editor of Journal of Social and Political Philosophy.

== Education ==
- Ph.D. Department of Political Science, University of Chicago, August 2002
- M.A. Department of Political Science, Korea University, March 1993
- B.A. Department of Political Science, Korea University, March 1991

== Academic awards and fellowships ==
- Yixian (逸仙) Scholar Award, Sun Yat-sen University, 2024.
- The Ministry of Education Research Fund, Ministry of Education, China, 2017.
- 100-Hundred Talented Professor Research Fund, Sun Yat-sen University, 2016
- The Excellent Scholarly Book Award, Re-reading Machiavelli (2014), the National Academy of Sciences, South Korea, 2015
- The Premi e contribute per la traduzione, Machiavelli’s Il Principe, Ministry of Foreign Affairs, Italy, 2014
- The Excellent Scholarly Book Award, Domination & Non-domination (2013), the Ministry of Culture Tourism, South Korea, 2014
- The Excellent Scholarly Book Award, Neo-Republicanism (translation, 2012), the National Academy of Sciences, South Korea, 2012
- The Best Book Award for the Humanities, Beyond Border and Prejudice (2010), Ministry of Culture Tourism, South Korea, 2011
- Basic Research Grant, National Research Foundation, Korea, 2010
- Social Science Korea Grant, National Research Foundation, Korea, 2010
- EAI ASI (Asia Security Initiative) Scholarship, MacArthur Foundation, 2009.
- POSCO Asia Research Grant 2007.
- New Scholar Grant, National Research Foundation, 2005
- The Lynde and Harry Bradley Foundation Dissertation Fellowship, 1999-2001.

== Selected papers ==
- “Relationality without Hierarchy: Hong Daeyong’s Reappraisal of Tianxia,” in Tianxia in Comparative Perspective: Alternative Models of Geopolitical Order, edited by Roger Ames, Sor-hoon Tan, and Y. H. Yang (University of Hawaii Press, 2023).
- “Individuality with Relationality: Ahn Changho’s Modern Transvaluation of Confucianism.” Philosophy East and West, (2023)
- “A Confucian Reappraisal of Christian Love: Ahn Changho Contra Augustinian Studies Conducted in South Korea.” Religions, (2023).
- “Non-domination with Nothingness: Supplementing Pettit’s Theory of Democratic Deliberation.” Journal of Social and Political Philosophy, (2023).
- “Confucian Role-Ethics with Non-Domination: Civil Compliance in Times of Crisis.” Ethical Theory and Moral Practice, (2022)
- “Interview with Philip Pettit: Neo-Roman Republicanism and Northeast Asia,” with Philip Pettit Comparative Political Theory, (2022).
- “Deliberation with Persuasion: the ‘political’ in Aristotle’s Politics.” Australian Journal of Political Science, (2021).
- “Overcoming Victimhood: Forward-looking Apology with Reciprocal Non-domination,” Korean Journal of Political Science, (2021).
- “Global Justice without Self-Centrism: Tianxia in Dialogues on Mount Uisan.” Dao: A Journal of Comparative Philosophy, (2021).
- “Republican Liberation and Non-domination: Democratic Republicanism and the March First Movement.” Korea Observer, (2019)..
- “Republican Patriotism and Machiavelli’s Patriotism, Australian Journal of Political Science, (2017).
- “Nationalism and Democracy Revisited: The Limits of Democratic Nationalism in South Korea,” The Korean Journal of International Studies, (2013).
- "The Politics of Aspiration". Japanese Journal of Political Thought. (2010). [Japanese]

== Selected books ==
- Kwak Jun-Hyeok, Modernities in Northeast Asia, with Ken Cheng (Routledge, 2023). ISBN 978-1032505602
- Kwak Jun-Hyeok, 《西方政治哲学导论》（Chinese, Introduction to Western Political Philosophy）中国社会科学出版社 (Beijing: 2023). ISBN 9787522716091
- Kwak Jun-Hyeok, Machiavelli in Northeast Asia (Routledge, 2022). ISBN 978-1032256917
- Kwak Jun-Hyeok, Global Justice in East Asia, with Hugo El Kholi (Routledge, 2020 & Paperback Edition 2021). ISBN 0367280981
- Kwak Jun-Hyeok, Leo Strauss in Northeast Asia, with Sungwoo Park (Routledge, 2019 & Paperback Edition 2021). ISBN 978-0367210977
- Kwak Jun-Hyeok, with Jangjip Choi et al, Lectures on Classics (Seoul: Minumsa, 2018). ISBN 9788937436611
- Kwak Jun-Hyeok, with Jungin Kang et al, Challenges of Public Society (Seoul: Minumsa, 2016). ISBN 9788937457272
- Kwak Jun-Hyeok, Political Philosophy I & II (Korean, Two Volumes, Korea, Seoul, Minumsa, 2016). ISBN 9788937433009, 9788937433016
- Kwak Jun-Hyeok, Republicanism in Northeast Asia, with Leigh Jenco (Routledge 2015 & Paperback Edition 2017). ISBN 978-0-415-74668-7
- Kwak Jun-Hyeok, Patriotism in East Asia, with Koichiro Matsuda (Routledge 2015 & Paperback Edition 2017). ISBN 978-0-415-73715-9
- Kwak Jun-Hyeok, Re-Reading Machiavelli, Realist with Imagination (Korean, Seoul, Minumsa, 2014). ISBN 9788937487996
- Kwak, Jun-Hyeok; Nobles, Melissa, eds. (2013). Inherited Responsibility and Historical Reconciliation in East Asia. Routledge. ISBN 978-1-135-07305-3.
