= Deborah Kay Fitzgerald =

American historian of technology

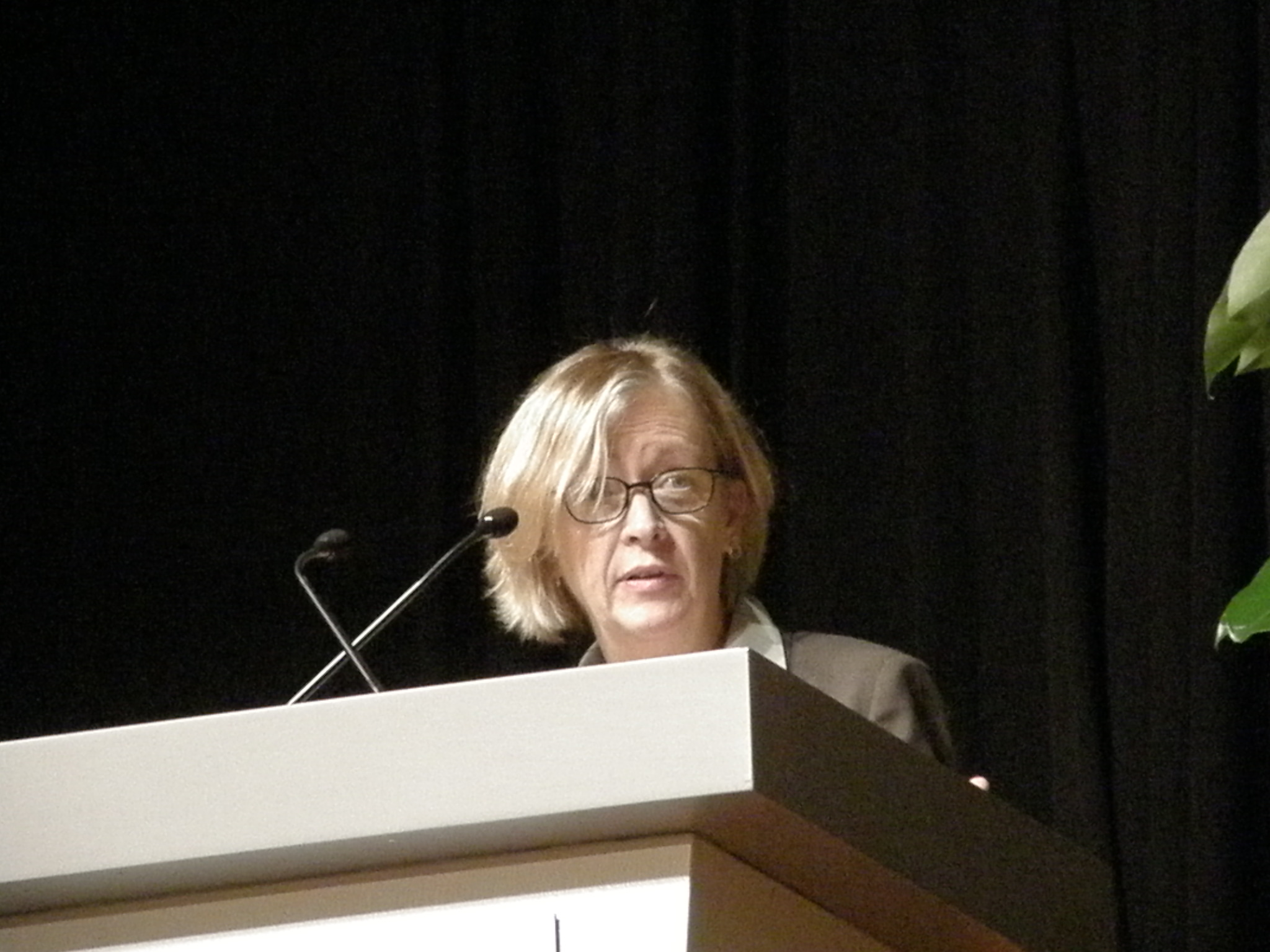
- Deborah Fitzgerald at the MIT Excellence Awards 2008
- Born: Remsen, Iowa, U.S.
- Occupation: Historian of technology

Academic background
- Education: Iowa State University (BA 1978); University of Pennsylvania (PhD 1985)
- Doctoral advisor: Charles E. Rosenberg

Academic work
- Discipline: Historian
- Sub-discipline: History of technology; History of agriculture; United States history
- Institutions: Harvard University (1985–1988); MIT (1988–)

Deborah Kay Fitzgerald is an American historian of technology best known for her work on United States agricultural technology in the early twentieth century. She is professor of the History of Technology in the Science, Technology, and Society Program at the Massachusetts Institute of Technology and served as dean of the MIT School of Humanities, Arts, and Social Sciences 2006–2015. She authored The Business of Breeding: Hybrid Corn in Illinois, 1890–1920 (1990) and Every Farm a Factory: The Industrial Ideal in American Agriculture (2003), which both discuss the industrialization of agriculture in the early 20th century.

She won the 2003 Theodore Saloutos Memorial Award for her Every Farm a Factory and the 2015 Gladys L. Baker Award for lifetime achievement, both from the Agricultural History Society, and she served as its president 2004–2005.

== Early life and education ==
Fitzgerald started her life as a youngest child with three older siblings; she grew up with her two parents in Remsen, Iowa.

She briefly attended the University of Northern Colorado after high school and dropped out after one semester after becoming pregnant. She returned to Remsen then stayed in a maternity home until she had the baby and gave the child up for adoption.

She returned to college, this time at Iowa State University, and graduated with a Bachelor of Arts degree in History and English in 1978. Fitzgerald found she fit well in the collegiate scene after discovering her love for learning and writing. She pursued her interest in history after studying writers of the 19th century, particularly Thomas Carlyle and John Ruskin, and how they responded to the Industrial Revolution and Scientific Revolution.

After graduating from Iowa State, Fitzgerald moved to Wynnefield, Philadelphia with her husband Eric Sealine and attended graduate school at the University of Pennsylvania (UPenn), where she developed an interest in the history of agricultural biotechnology, specifically the hybridization of corn, through taking classes at UPenn as well as through her advisor Charles E. Rosenberg. She returned to her hometown of Remsen to interview farmers that were doing experiments related to corn hybridization. Also within this time she gave birth to a son and lost her mother and father in law, which were challenges while writing her dissertation. She finished her PhD in History and the Sociology of Science at UPenn in 1985.

== Career ==
A year into writing her dissertation, Fitzgerald was offered a one-year job at Harvard University by Everett Mendelsohn, shocking both her male colleagues and herself. After finishing her PhD, she moved with her son and husband to Cambridge, Massachusetts. She started her second year in Harvard's History of Science department as the lead tutor in the department.

She stayed at Harvard for three years before she took up a job at MIT as a historian of technology in 1988. This was the same year that the STS graduate program at MIT began, giving Fitzgerald the role of the director of graduate studies within the program, which she held for over five years. In 1990, she published The Business of Breeding: Hybrid Corn in Illinois, 1890–1940, which received mixed positive reviews that noted clear, informative discussion of USDA research and somewhat controversial criticisms of the corporate hybrid seed industry.

In 1996 she became chair of MIT's PhD program in history, anthropology, and STS, retaining the position until 2001. In June 2000, she became chair of the Gender Equity Committee of the MIT School of Humanities, Arts and Social Sciences (SHASS).

In 2003, her book Every Farm a Factory: The Industrial Ideal in American Agriculture won the Theodore Saloutos Memorial Award of the Agricultural History Society. She served as president of the society 2004–2005 and began its series of annual conferences in 2006.

On April 1, 2005, SHASS dean Philip Khoury invited Fitzgerald to become his associate dean. In this role, she found an interest in administration. After a year and a half in the position, Khoury took a promotion to the provost office, leaving the seat of acting dean to Fitzgerald in 2006. She then took the permanent role of Dean of SHASS in 2007 and held it until July 1, 2015. In this role, she argued that humanities were as necessary to MIT students as their STEM classes.

In 2015, she was awarded the Agricultural History Society's Gladys L. Baker Award for lifetime achievement.

== Selected works ==
=== Books ===
- Fitzgerald, Deborah Kay (1990). The Business of Breeding: Hybrid Corn in Illinois, 1890–1940. Cornell University Press. ISBN 0-8014-2233-7. OCLC 20635439.
- Fitzgerald, Deborah Kay (2003). Every Farm a Factory: The Industrial Ideal in American Agriculture. Yale University Press. ISBN 0-300-08813-2. OCLC 50339873.

=== Research articles and chapters ===
- Busch, L. M., & Fitzgerald, D. K. (1986). Tradition and Innovation in Agriculture: A Comparison of Public and Private Development of Hybrid Corn. In The Agricultural Scientific Enterprise: A system in transition. Routledge.
- Fitzgerald, D. (1986). Exporting American agriculture: The Rockefeller Foundation in Mexico, 1943–53. Social Studies of Science, 16(3), 457–483. https://doi.org/10.1177/030631286016003003
- Fitzgerald, D. (1991). Beyond tractors: The history of technology in American agriculture. Technology and Culture, 32(1), 114. https://doi.org/10.2307/3106015
- Fitzgerald, D. (1993). Farmers deskilled: Hybrid corn and farmers' work. Technology and Culture, 34(2), 324. https://doi.org/10.2307/3106539
- Fitzgerald, D., & Clarke, S. H. (1996). Regulation and the revolution in united states farm productivity. Technology and Culture, 37(4), 851. https://doi.org/10.2307/3107113
- Fitzgerald, D. (2018). The profit of the earth: The global seeds of American agriculture. Journal of American History, 105(1), 145–145. https://doi.org/10.1093/jahist/jay034
- Fitzgerald, D., Onaga, L., Pawley, E., Phillips, D., & Vetter, J. (2018). Roundtable: Agricultural history and the history of science. Agricultural History, 92(4), 569. https://doi.org/10.3098/ah.2018.092.4.569
- Fitzgerald, D. (2020). World War II and the quest for time-insensitive foods. Osiris, 35, 291–309. https://doi.org/10.1086/709509

=== Leadership articles ===
- Fitzgerald, D. K. (2014, April 30). At MIT, the humanities are just as important as STEM – The Boston Globe. BostonGlobe.com. Retrieved November 30, 2022, from https://www.bostonglobe.com/opinion/2014/04/30/mit-humanities-are-just-important-stem/ZOArg1PgEFy2wm4ptue56I/story.html
- Fitzgerald, D. K. (2020, July 23). A professor's last crucial decision: When to retire. The Chronicle of Higher Education. Retrieved November 30, 2022, from https://www.chronicle.com/article/a-professors-last-crucial-decision-when-to-retire/
