= Knight Science Journalism =

Journalism fellowship program at MIT

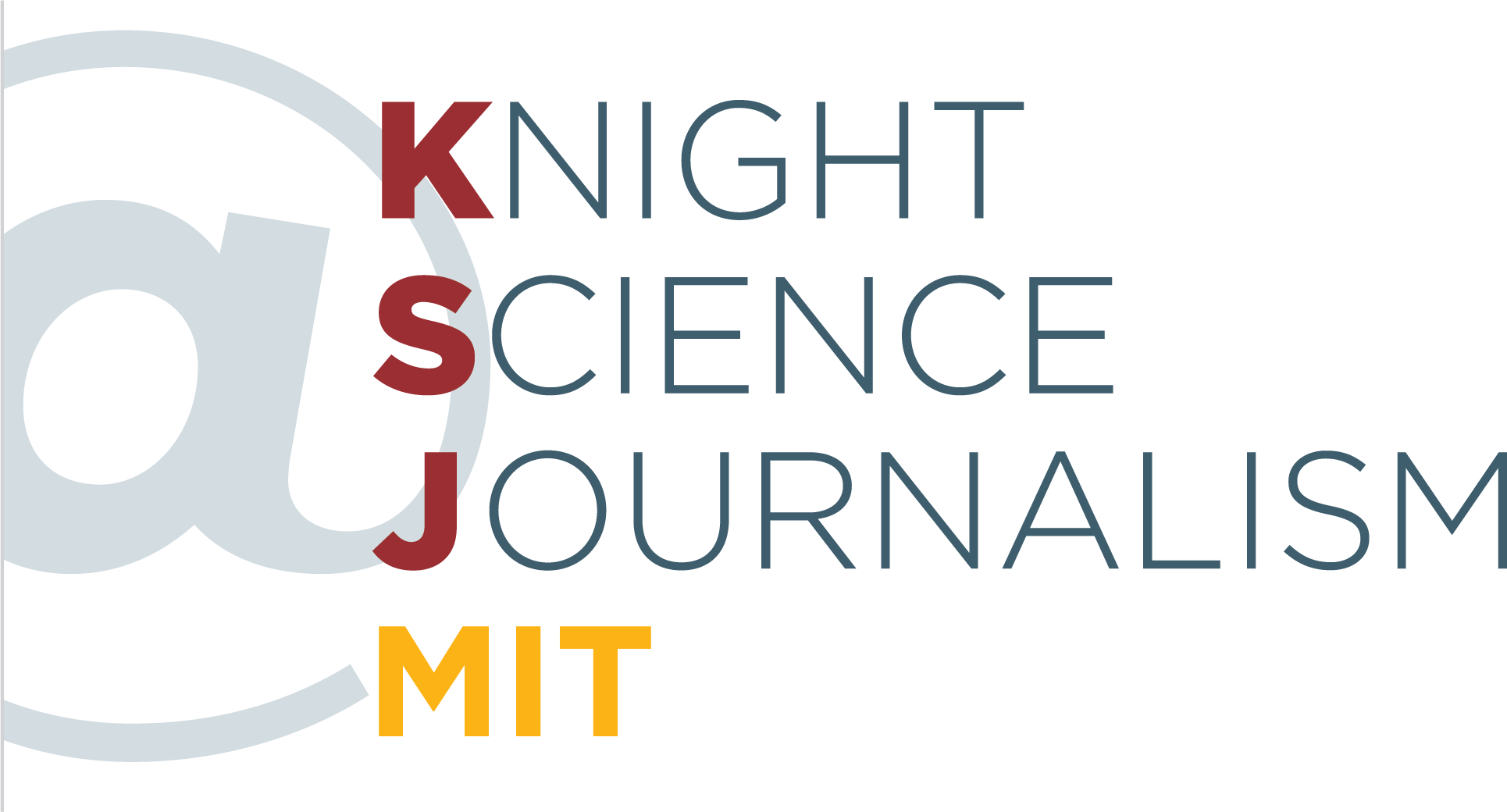
Logo, KSJ@MIT

The Knight Science Journalism program (styled as "KSJ@MIT") offers 9-month research fellowships, based at its headquarters at the MIT School of Humanities, Arts, and Social Sciences, to elite staff and freelance journalists specializing in coverage of science and technology, medicine, or the environment. Fellows are chosen from an international application pool in a competitive process each spring, and reside in Cambridge, Massachusetts, for two semesters of audited coursework and research at MIT, Harvard, and surrounding institutions.

The program is currently directed by Usha Lee McFarling.

KSJ@MIT has hosted more than 300 fellows from a wide range of national and international publications, including The New York Times, The Wall Street Journal, Forbes, Time, Scientific American, Science, the Associated Press, ABC News, and CNN.

Eligible applicants can work for print, broadcast or the web as reporters, writers, editors, or producers.

In 2016, the program launched an editorially independent digital science magazine called Undark.

== History ==
KSJ@MIT was launched in 1983 by Victor McElheny. It is administratively a part of the Program in Science, Technology, and Society (STS) located in the MIT School of Humanities, Arts and Social Sciences. The program and its activities is primarily funded by an endowment from the John S. and James L. Knight Foundation. Additional funding has been provided by the Alfred P. Sloan Foundation, the Mellon Foundation, and the Kavli Foundation.

== Format ==
The nine-month program is designed to offer selected fellows a year away from deadlines to pursue intellectual enrichment, develop new sources, and explore aspects of science and its interaction with economic, political, and cultural forces that would ordinarily be out of reach for a working science journalist. Fellows typically audit courses on a non-graded, non-credit basis at MIT, Harvard University, and other nearby institutions including Boston University, Tufts University, Northeastern University, and Brandeis University.

== See also ==
- Undark Magazine
- Victor McElheny
