= MIT School of Humanities, Arts, and Social Sciences =

School at the Massachusetts Institute of Technology

Massachusetts Institute of Technology School of Humanities, Arts, and Social Sciences
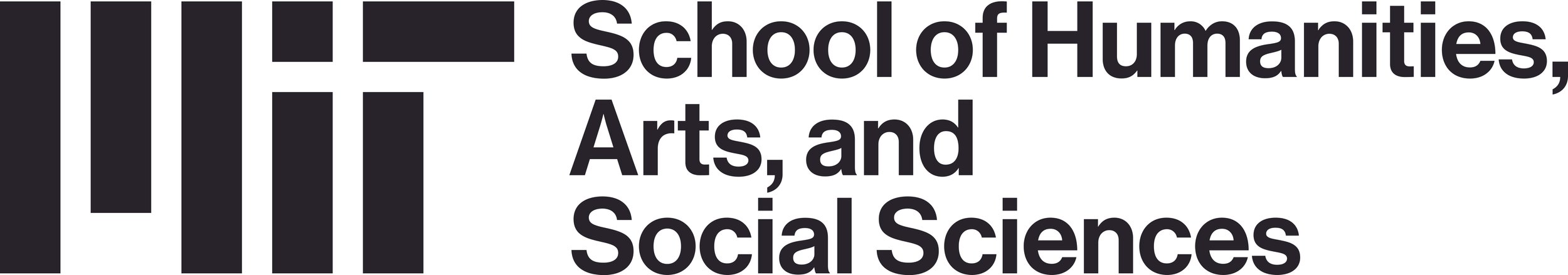
- Type: Private land-grant research university
- Established: December 1950; 75 years ago
- Academic affiliations: AAU; AITU; COFHE; NAICU; URA; Sea grant; Space grant
- Dean: Agustín Rayo
- Academic staff: 170
- Students: 355 (2023–24)
- Undergraduates: 53 (2023–24)
- Location: Cambridge, Massachusetts, United States; 42°21′35″N 71°05′31″W
- Campus: 166 acres (67.2 ha); Midsize city
- Mascot: Tim the Beaver
- Website: shass.mit.edu

The MIT School of Humanities, Arts, and Social Sciences (SHASS) is one of the five schools of the Massachusetts Institute of Technology, located in Cambridge, Massachusetts, in the United States. The school includes 11 academic areas and works alongside six departments, labs, and programs. SHASS grants SB, SM, and PhD degrees. Major fields of study include anthropology, comparative media studies and writing, economics, history, linguistics, literature, music, philosophy, political science, science, technology, and society, and theater arts. Other programs include the Center for International Studies; Knight Science Journalism; Science, Technology, and Society; Security Studies; and HyperStudio (digital humanities).

As of 2022, the Dean of the School is Professor Agustín Rayo. With dozens of faculty members, hundreds of graduate students, 109 undergraduate majors, and 161 minors, the school is the fourth largest at MIT. All MIT undergraduates must take at least eight semesters of courses (approximately 25 percent of total classroom time) in SHASS as part of the General Institute Requirements for a diploma, and those minoring or majoring within the School undertake additional studies and projects.

== History ==
Writing in its first catalogue, MIT founder William Barton Rogers wrote that the institute's purpose was "to furnish such a general education, founded upon the mathematical, physical, and natural sciences, English and other Modern Languages, and Mental and Political Science, as shall form a fitting preparation for any of the departments of active life." MIT, in accordance with Rogers' vision, has offered courses in the humanities since its inception.

Reports to the president and corporation began in 1871. The first report was published in 1872.

=== Foundation ===
The MIT Corporation changed the way the institute was organized in 1932. It created a division that would become the School of Humanities, Arts, and Social Sciences. Initially, the Humanities division offered no degrees. Available classes included English, history, economics, and language, with "...[additional] instruction in such fields as sociology, labor relations, government, international relations, law, philosophy, psychology, literature, music, and fine arts for both undergraduate and graduate students."

Later in 1932, the Division of Humanities was expanded to include Economics, Statistics, the Department of English, History, and Modern Languages.

A four-year program whose focus was the humanities was adopted by MIT faculty in 1944. A report published in 1949, the Committee on Educational Survey, recommended the establishment of a school that would grant humanities degrees.

=== School officially established ===
Then named the School of Humanities and Sciences, SHASS was founded in December, 1950. That same year, the Center for International Studies was placed within the School but wasn't officially recognized as a degree-granting program. A Department of Economics and Social Science began in 1951 with a psychology program. The Institute launched the Humanities track (Course XXI) in 1955. This allowed students to major in humanities or social sciences alongside concentrations in science or engineering. A political science program followed in 1956.

Course XXI introduced a graduate program in political science in 1958. The Institute officially changed the program name to School of Humanities and Social Science (SHSS) in 1959 the name of the school was changed to School of Humanities and Social Science.

=== Expansion and evolution ===
The Institute began simultaneously expanding and consolidating course and major offerings and departments in the early 1960s. Changes included:

- History (established as a separate section in 1960)
- Philosophy (established as a separate section in 1961)
- Music (organized at MIT circa 1884 and established as a separate section in 1961)
- Literature (established as a separate section in 1962)
- Foreign Languages and Linguistics (accorded departmental status in 1965)
  - Graduate programs
    - Psychology (established in 1960)
    - Linguistics (established in 1961)
    - Philosophy (established in 1963)

The Economics and Social Science course offerings were spun off into their own departments in 1965. The undergraduate major in humanities launched in 1967. The SHSS boasted five departments (Humanities, Economics, Political Science, Modern Languages and Linguistics, and Psychology) and one research center (the Center for International Studies) by 1968.

The Institute revised its student requirements in 1974. The Humanities, Arts, and Social Sciences (HASS) requirement said students had to take at least three subjects in three separate humanities fields.

The Institute discontinued the Department of Foreign Languages and Linguistics course in 1975, consolidating foreign languages, literature, and linguistics in the humanities. Additionally:

- The Department of Philosophy was combined with linguistics to form the Department of Linguistics and Philosophy in 1976
- Technology Studies was combined with a new program: Science, Technology, and Society
- The Women's Studied program was launched (1984)

=== Curriculum and program updates: Broadening perspectives ===
In 1971 a Commission on MIT Education began investigating General Institute Requirements in the humanities and social sciences. Two years later in 1973 the institute, in an effort to closely connect the humanities with science and engineering.

As part of this restructuring, Psychology was subsumed into the Brain and Cognitive Sciences program.

Beginning July 2015, the Foreign Languages and Literatures Section was renamed Global Studies and Languages, later renamed Global Languages.

On July 1, 2000, the school changed its name from the School of Humanities and Social Science to the School of Humanities, Arts, and Social Sciences.

SHASS hosted a colloquium for its 50th anniversary on October 6, 2000.

In the early 2000s, SHASS leadership launched the MIT Center for Arts, Science, and Technology (MIT CAST). Later, the MIT International Science and Technology Initiatives (MISTI) program received institutional support for its growth and expansion.

== Departments, labs, and centers ==
SHASS comprises eleven academic areas and works alongside six labs and programs.

=== Graduate programs ===
- Economics
- History, Anthropology, Science, Technology, and Society
- Linguistics
- Music Technology and Computation
- Philosophy
- Political Science
- Science Writing

== Buildings and infrastructure ==
In March 2017, MIT announced the new Theater Arts Building (Building W97) located at 345 Vassar Street at the far western end of campus. Constructed in a completely renovated former warehouse, the facility consolidates the performance and design spaces of a new academic major in Theater Arts, which was established in 2015.

The building's 25,000 square feet (2,300 m^{2}) includes a two-story, 180-seat, multimedia-equipped performance space which can be reconfigured for each use; as well as a rehearsal studio, dressing rooms, and set and costume makerspaces.

In 2025, MIT opened the Edward and Joyce Linde Music Building, a 35,000-square-foot space comprising three areas: the Thomas Tull Concert Hall, the Jae S. and Kyuho Lim Music Maker Pavilion, and the Beatrice and Stephen Erdely Music and Culture Space. Designed by Japanese architectural firm SANAA, the space is the home for MIT's music and music technology programs.

== Awards associated with the school ==
As of 2017, 4 Nobel Laureates, 7 MacArthur Fellows, and 4 Pulitzer Prize winners were members of the SHASS faculty. Additionally, 2 National Medal of Science awardees, 11 National Academy of Sciences Fellows, 57 American Academy of Arts and Sciences Fellows, 40 Guggenheim Fellowships, and 5 John Bates Clark Medalists are associated with SHASS.

In 2018, the Times Higher Education World University Rankings rated MIT the #2 university for arts and humanities.

In 2021, Zahra Hirji and Lisa Song of the MIT Graduate Program in Science Writing won Seal Awards for consistent excellence in environmental journalism published by Bloomberg News and ProPublica, respectively.

== Deans ==
- Edwin S. Burdell, 1937–1938
- Robert Granville Caldwell, 1938–1948
- John Ely Burchard, 1948–1964
- Robert Lyle Bishop, 1964–1973
- Harold John Hanham, 1973–1984
- Ann Fetter Friedlaender, 1984–1990
- Philip S. Khoury, 1990–2006
- Deborah Kay Fitzgerald, 2006 (acting), 2007–2015
- Melissa Nobles, 2015–2021
- Agustin Rayo, 2021 (acting), 2022–present
