= Kwak Kyung-sup =

South Korean electrical engineer

Kyung Sup Kwak (born 1949) is a South Korean electrical engineer, a professor in the Graduate School of Information Technology and Telecommunication at Inha University, South Korea.

Kwak did his undergraduate studies at Inha University, earning a bachelor's degree in electrical engineering in 1977. He received a master's degree in electrical engineering from the University of Southern California in 1981, and a Ph.D. in communication theory and systems from the University of California, San Diego in 1988. He was president of the Korean Institute of Communication Sciences in 2006.
