= Kwak Seung-Jun =

South Korean economist and former policy advisor

- Born: October 10, 1960 (age 66)
- Education: Korea University; Vanderbilt University

Korean name
- Hangul: 곽승준
- RR: Gwak Seungjun
- MR: Kwak Sŭngjun

Kwak Seung-Jun (Korean: 곽승준; born October 10, 1960) is a South Korean economist, academic, and public policy advisor. He is a professor of economics at Korea University and served as Chairman of the Presidential Council for Future and Vision under President Lee Myung-bak.

== Early life and education ==
Kwak received a Bachelor of Economics from Korea University in 1984. He completed a Master of Science in Economics at Vanderbilt University in 1986, and earned his Ph.D. in Economics there in 1992.

== Academic career ==
Kwak began his academic career in 1994 as a principal researcher at the Korea Research Institute for Human Settlements. He joined Korea University’s College of Political Science and Economics as a professor in 1995. From 2002 to 2007, he was a visiting professor at Vanderbilt University.

His research interests include environmental economics, urban policy, and public finance. His notable works include:

- "Contingent Valuation in Korean Environmental Planning: A Pilot Application to the Protection of Drinking Water in Seoul" (1994), with Clifford S. Russell.
- "Measuring the Economic Benefits of Recycling: The Case of the Waste Agricultural Film in Korea" (2004), with Seung-Hoon Yoo and Chan-Jun Kim.

== Government service and political involvement ==
Kwak played a central role in public policy under President Lee Myung-bak. His government service includes:

- Member of the 17th Presidential Transition Committee (2007–2008).
- Senior Secretary to the President for State Affairs Planning (2008).
- Chairman of the Presidential Council for Future and Vision (2009–2013).

At the Presidential Council for Future and Vision, his policy focus areas included clamping down on education expenditures, growing the semiconductor industry, and strengthening commercial ties with the UAE.

In 2011, Kwak publicly advocated for the National Pension Service to take a more active role in shareholder governance to promote corporate reform, a move that stirred national debate.

In 2017, during the 19th South Korean presidential election, Kwak briefly joined the campaign of former United Nations Secretary-General Ban Ki-moon. He withdrew from the campaign before Ban's own departure from the race.

== Media and broadcasting ==
In January 2012, Kwak made a guest appearance on a political satire skit of Saturday Night Live Korea Season one, episode 8.

After returning to his professorship at Korea University, Kwak became a familiar face on television. From November 1, 2012, to December 23, 2020, he hosted the political education variety show Kwak Seung-jun's Cool Kkadang (ko:쿨까당) on tvN, known for discussing social and policy issues with humor and accessibility.

In May 2021, he hosted Kwak's LP Bar (곽씨네 LP바), a late-night talk show styled as a nostalgic LP music lounge. The show ended after a short two-month run.

== Other roles ==
Kwak has held various institutional and advisory positions:

- Director of Policy Planning, Global Strategies Institute
- Member, City Planning Committee, Seoul Metropolitan Government (2006)
- Member, Management Innovation Committee, Korea Housing Finance Corporation (2005)
- Editor-in-chief, Korea University Newspaper (2002–2007)

== Publications ==
Kwak has written or contributed to several books and reports, including:

- The Emissions Trading System (1998)
- North Korea in Transition: Prospects for Economic and Social Reform (2000)
- Applying Economics to the Environment (2007)

== Recognition ==
He received the Best Paper Award from the Korea Research Institute for Human Settlements in 2003.

== See also ==
- Economy of South Korea
- Environmental economics
