= Agustín Rayo =

Mexican philosopher, professor, and dean (born 1973)

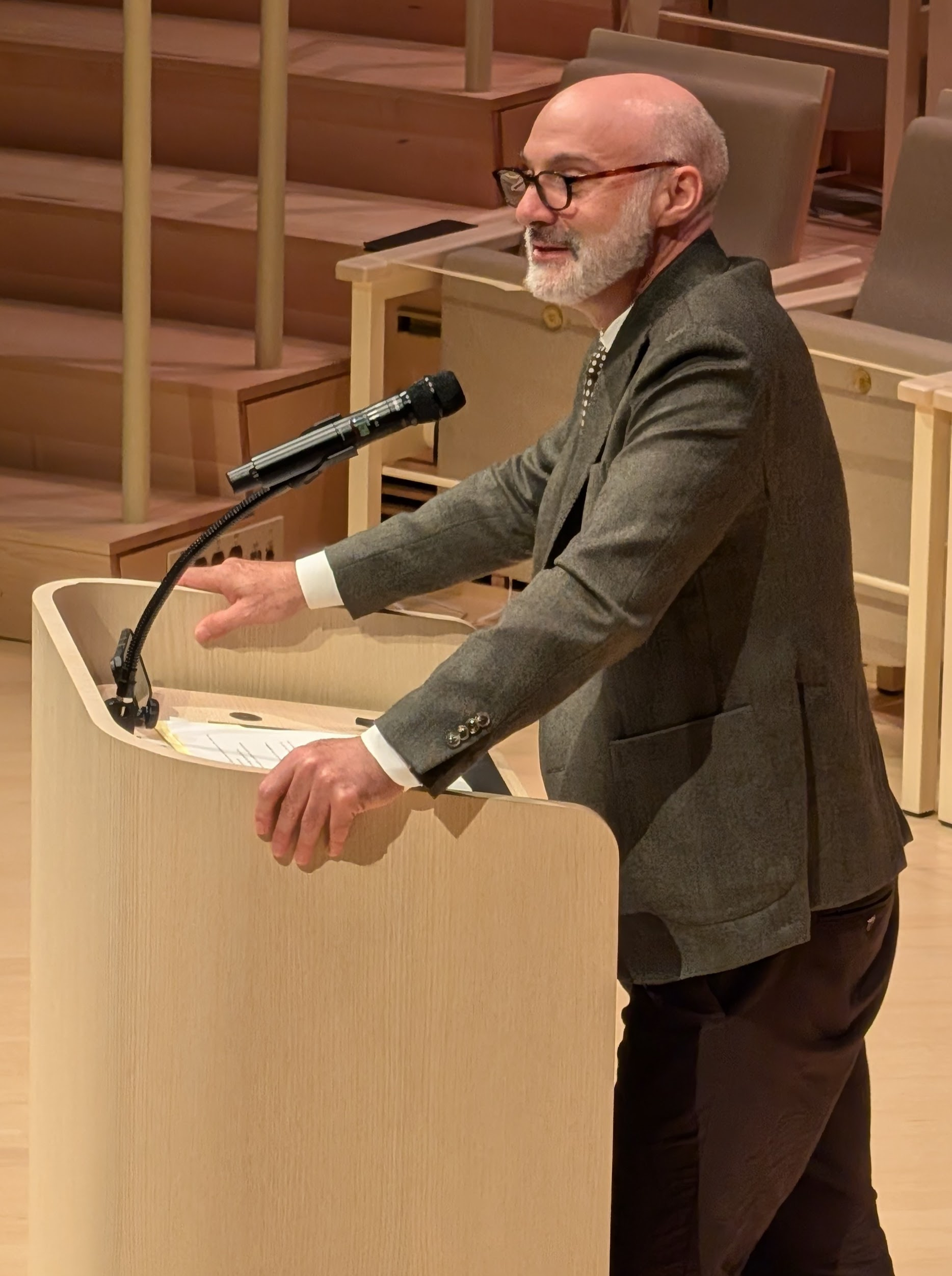
Agustín Rayo

Agustín Rayo Fierro (Spanish: [ˈraʝo]; born 1973) is a Mexican philosopher of logic, metaphysics, and language. He is the dean of the MIT School of Humanities, Arts, and Social Sciences and a professor of philosophy. He was the first to define Rayo's number, which was named after him as a result.

== Life ==
Rayo was raised in Mexico City. He completed a bachelor's degree at the National Autonomous University of Mexico in 1996. Rayo earned a Ph.D. at Massachusetts Institute of Technology in 2001. He was a postdoctoral researcher at the University of St Andrews.

Rayo was an assistant professor of philosophy at the University of California, San Diego. In 2005, he joined the MIT School of Humanities, Arts, and Social Sciences. Rayo was the associate dean from 2016 to 2019. He succeeded Melissa Nobles in 2021 as interim dean.

In 2007, Rayo and philosophy professor at Princeton University, Adam Elga, participated a 'Big Number Duel. The two took turns writing increasingly big numbers on a blackboard.

Rayo was elected to the Norwegian Academy of Science and Letters in 2018. His book, On the Brink of Paradox (2019) won the 2020 PROSE Award for best textbook in the humanities, mathematics and sciences.

== Books ==
- (ed. with Gabriel Uzquiano) Absolute Generality, Oxford University Press, 2007
- The Construction of Logical Space, Oxford University Press, 2013
- La construcción del espacio de posibilidades, Instituto de Investigaciones Filosóficas, 2015
- On the Brink of Paradox, MIT Press, 2019

== Other selected publications ==
- "Nominalism through de-nominalization." Noûs 35 (1): 74-92 (2001).
- "Word and objects." Noûs 36 (3): 436-464 (2006).
