= World Peace Foundation =

- Established: 1910 (116 years ago)
- Types: organization
- Aim: peace process
- Directors: Alex de Waal
- Website: worldpeacefoundation.org

The World Peace Foundation or WPF, created in 1910, is a philanthropic foundation for research into peace processes affiliated with The Fletcher School of Law and Diplomacy at Tufts University. Alex de Waal is the director as of 2021, having become director in 2011.

The WPF founded the journal International Organization, which is the leading journal in the field of International Relations.

== Creation ==
The World Peace Foundation was created in 1910 under the directorship of Edwin D. Mead and financed by Edwin Ginn, a wealthy publisher, who initially named it the International School of Peace. Ginn felt that massive financial investments in war should be matched by, at least, modest investments in Kant's notion of peace via democracy (Perpetual Peace: A Philosophical Sketch). Ginn financed the school, the name was changed to World Peace Foundation, and his endowment allowed the institute to continue after his death in 1914.

== Leadership and structure ==
The initial director of the WPF in 1910 was Edwin D. Mead. Robert I. Rotberg was director from 1993 to 2010. WPF was affiliated with the Harvard Kennedy School for the first decade of the twenty-first century. Alex de Waal became director in 2011, when the WPF moved to The Fletcher School at Tufts University.

Philip S. Khoury was chair of the board in 2012.

In 2017, the WPF had 6 employees and a budget of US$1,754,057.

== Aims ==
The WPF was described by its board chair Khoury as the "oldest secular peace foundation" in the United States (US). Khoury quoted the original objectives of the WPF as being, "Educating the people of all nations to a full knowledge of the waste and destructiveness of war and of preparation for war, its evil effects on present social conditions and on the wellbeing of future generations, and to promote international justice and the brotherhood of man, and generally by every practical means to promote peace and goodwill among all mankind." He stated that there was no intention to change the aim of the foundation.

== Publications ==
- International Organization (quarterly). Founded in 1947.
- Documents of International Organizations: A Selected Bibliography (quarterly)
