= Guo Chun =

Chinese painter

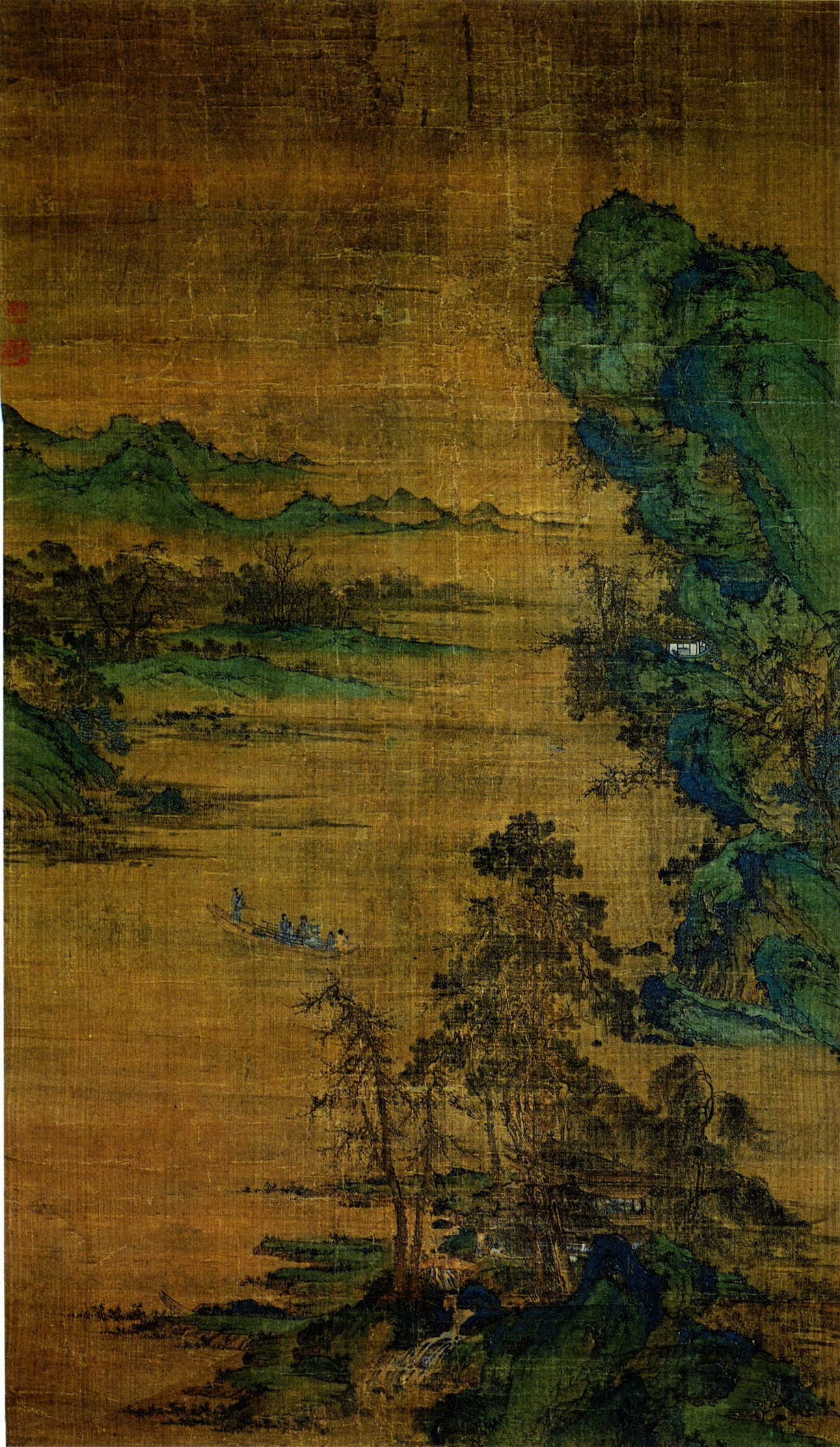
Guo Chun, Red Cliff or Green Landscape

Guo Chun (simplified Chinese: 郭纯; traditional Chinese: 郭純; pinyin: Guō Chún; Wade–Giles: Kuo Ch'un; 1370–1444), was an imperial Chinese painter in the early Ming dynasty.

Guo was born in Yongjia in Zhejiang province. His original given name was Wentong (文通), but this was changed to Chun (純) by the Yongle Emperor. From then on his style name was Wentong. His pseudonym was Pu'an (樸庵). He was known for his landscape paintings.
