= Philip S. Khoury =

American historian (born 1949)

- Born: October 15, 1949 (age 77); Washington, D.C., United States
- Education: American University of Beirut; Trinity College (BA, 1971); Harvard University (Ph.D. 1980)
- Occupation: Professor
- Known for: Ford International Professor of History and Vice Provost at MIT, Chairman of the Board of Trustees at AUB

Philip S. Khoury (born October 15, 1949) is Ford International Professor of History and Vice Provost at MIT. He is also a trustee of the American University of Beirut and previously served as Chairman from July 2009 till June 2024.

== Life ==
Khoury was born on October 15, 1949, in Washington, D.C. the son of Shukry E. Khoury, a naturalized American lawyer, and Angela Jurdak Khoury, a Lebanese diplomat and educator. He was educated at the Sidwell Friends School (1953–1967) in Washington and then at the American University of Beirut, Trinity College (BA, 1971), and Harvard University (PhD, 1980). In 1981, he joined MIT as an assistant professor of history, rising to the rank of professor.

From 1991-2006, Khoury served as Dean of the MIT School of Humanities, Arts, and Social Sciences. During his deanship, he helped to maintain the national leadership of his school's doctoral programs, introduced new master's programs in Comparative Media Studies and Science Writing, expanded its international studies faculty and programs, and raised considerable new endowment. In 2002, he was appointed the first Kenan Sahin Dean of Humanities, Arts, and Social Sciences at MIT. He left the dean's office in 2006 to become Vice Provost responsible for overseeing MIT’s non-curricular arts programs and initiatives, including the MIT Museum and the List Visual Arts Center, strategic planning for international education and research, the promotion of the public understanding of science and technology, and the OpenCourseWare Publishing Initiative.

Khoury established in 1985, and has chaired ever since, the Emile Bustani Middle East Seminar, an MIT forum focused on contemporary Middle Eastern affairs. He also co-founded in 1986 and chaired until 2006, the John E. Burchard Scholars Program, MIT's undergraduate society of fellows in the humanities, arts, and social sciences.

Khoury has been awarded fellowships from the Fulbright-Hays Foundation, Social Science Research Council, Andrew W. Mellon Foundation, Aspen Institute for Humanistic Studies, and Thomas J. Watson Foundation. He has been a Visiting Associate of St. Antony's College in the University of Oxford and a Faculty Associate of Harvard University’s Center for Middle Eastern Studies. He has received the Distinguished Alumni Medal of the American University of Beirut, the Alumni Medal of Excellence of Trinity College, and the Distinguished Alumni Award of the Sidwell Friends School.

== Honors ==
- 1987; George Louis Beer Prize of the American Historical Association, Syria and the French Mandate
- 1998; elected President of the Middle East Studies Association (MESA)
- 2002; elected Fellow of the American Academy of Arts and Sciences.
- 2008; elected Fellow of the American Association for the Advancement of Science
- 2016; Honorary Degree, Earth University
- 2021; Honorary Degree, Trinity College
- 2025; Honorary Degree, American University of Beirut
- 2025; Order of Merit, Lebanon

== Other positions ==
- Chairman, Board of Trustees, World Peace Foundation, 2004-15 (Trustee, 1999-2018)
- Chairman, Board of Trustees, American University of Beirut, July 2009-June 2024 (Trustee since 1997)
- Vice Chairman, Board of Trustees, Trinity College (Hartford CT), 2007-- (Trustee, 2000-2019)
- Trustee, Underwriters Laboratories, 2018--
- Trustee, Toynbee Prize Foundation, 1997-2019
- Trustee, National Humanities Center, 2007-2019
- Board of Overseers, Koç University 2006--
- Trustee, Museum of Fine Arts, Boston, 2006-2009.

== Publications (partial list) ==
- Urban Notables and Arab Nationalism (Cambridge University Press, 1983, 2003) ISBN 0-521-53323-6;
- Syria and the French Mandate (Princeton University Press, 1987), ISBN 0-691-05486-X, received the George Louis Beer Prize of the American Historical Association.

Khoury is co-editor of:

- Tribes and State Formation in the Middle East (University of California Press, 1991) ISBN 0-520-07080-1;
- Recovering Beirut: Urban Design and Post-war Reconstruction (Brill Publishers, 1993), ISBN 978-90-04-09911-1;
- The Modern Middle East: A Reader (I.B. Tauris, 1993, 2004), ISBN 0-520-08241-9;
