= Kaku (name) =

Kaku is a Japanese surname and a masculine Japanese given name. Notable people with the name include:

Surname:

- Michio Kaku (加來 道雄; born 1947), American physicist
- Genji Kaku (郭 源治; born 1956), Taiwanese-born Japanese baseball player
- Tomohiro Kaku (郭 智博; born 1984), Japanese actor
- Kento Kaku (賀来 賢人; born 1987), Japanese actor
- Yuji Kaku (賀来ゆうじ), Japanese manga artist

Given name:

- Kaku Takagawa (高川 格; 1915–1986), Japanese Go player
- Kaku Takashina (高品 格; 1919–1994), Japanese actor
