= SPARK Schools =

- SPARK Millpark Primary (2027)
- South Africa

Information
- Type: School Network (Independent)
- Motto: Service ₪ Persistence ₪ Achievement Responsibility ₪ Kindness
- Established: 2012
- Founder: Stacey Brewer (RSA); Ryan Harrison (RSA); Bailey Thomson (USA); Caitlin Burkholder-Travis (USA)
- Grades: R–12
- Enrollment: Over 17,000 scholars
- Education system: Blended Learning
- Affiliations: ISASA eAdvance Group; Pearson (PALF); Omidyar Network; Good Schools Fund
- Website: www.sparkschools.co.za

SPARK Schools is an independent school network in South Africa. SPARK Schools was founded by Stacey Brewer and Ryan Harrison in 2012. Their schools use a blended learning model with adaptive software and individualised learning to accelerate learning and increase student achievement. SPARK Schools uses a hybrid funding model, having attracted funding from both non-profit foundations focused on high-impact philanthropy and from for-profit impact investors.

There are 21 primary and five high schools in the SPARK Schools network, educating over 17,000 scholars.

== History ==
SPARK Schools was started to provide internationally competitive high-quality academic achievement to South African communities. The original motivation and concept for SPARK Schools was developed at the Gordon Institute of Business Science (GIBS), where Stacey Brewer, Bailey Thomson and Ryan Harrison are alumni. South Africa is consistently ranked among the worst-performing education systems in the world.

SPARK Schools was built on the belief that quality and affordability are not mutually exclusive when it comes to excellent education. SPARK Schools emerged as a pioneer of blended learning in Africa and implemented the first blended primary school model in Africa.

SPARK Ferndale was launched as the first SPARK school in 2013. SPARK Schools became an ISASA full member and accredited network in 2013.

=== SPARK core values ===
SPARK is an acronym for the schools' core values:

- Service
- Persistence
- Achievement
- Responsibility
- Kindness

The name of the network also took inspiration from the quotation often misattributed to William B. Yeats:

"Education is not the filling of a pail, but the lighting of a fire".

While this quotation is often attributed to the Irish poet W.B. Yeats, there is no evidence that he ever wrote or said those words.

=== Founding team ===
The founding team consisted of Stacey Brewer (Executive Director & Founding Principal), Ryan Harrison (Non-executive director), Bailey Thomson (Director of Leadership and Development) and Caitlin Burkholder-Travis (Director of Student Achievement).

== Education model ==
=== Foundation phase ===
SPARK Schools uses a lab rotation blended learning model that combines classroom instruction with adaptive software to accelerate learning and increase student achievement and make the students bored except reading eggs we are gonna unblock google. SPARK Schools uses a lab rotation blended learning model, pioneered by Rocketship Education.

The blended education model allows for a high level of individualised learning as scholars receive instruction in the classroom as well as through adaptive education technology.

=== Intermediate phase ===
SPARK Schools uses a flex model for scholars in Grades 4–7 (intermediate phase). At this level, scholars are placed in ability groups based on their own individual performance in the subjects. This allows for an even more individualised form of education.

=== High school ===
In January 2019, SPARK Schools launched their first high school—SPARK Randburg High School. SPARK Randburg High School, is located in Ferndale, Randburg. There are now five high schools in the network. SPARK High Schools focus on academic development that prepare scholars for matriculation and beyond.

=== Academic performance ===
Ambitious claims are made for SPARK Schools as a high-performing school network, with internationally relevant rigour and benchmark assessment.

== Media coverage ==
SPARK Schools has been featured in various media outlets including, the Economist, the Mail & Guardian, Forbes, the Sunday Times, the Sowetan, The Sunday Independent, and Finweek SPARK Schools has also been covered on various Radio and Television shows including, Talk Radio 702, Classic FM, iGIBS, and CNBC Africa.

SPARK Schools has also been featured in various academic publications such as Focus (Helen Suzman Foundation) and Acumen as well as various international blogs, such as Getting Smart, LeadSA, Daily Maverick The New Game and EdSurge.

SPARK Schools has been profiled in various forums and reports by ISASA, the Centre for Development and Enterprise and the Clayton Christensen Institute.

The earliest record of SPARK Schools can be found in the Sowetan Newspaper in an article titled: Low Cost Private Education Initiative.

== List of SPARK Schools ==
As at November 2024, there are 26 schools in the SPARK Schools network.

Gauteng, South Africa

- SPARK Alberton Primary
- SPARK Bedfordview Primary
- SPARK Bramley Primary
- SPARK Carlswald Primary
- SPARK Centurion Primary
- SPARK Cresta Primary
- SPARK Ferndale Primary
- SPARK Kempton Park Primary
- SPARK Midrand Primary
- SPARK Midrand High
- SPARK Milpark Primary
- SPARK Randburg High School
- SPARK Randpark Ridge
- SPARK Riversands Primary
- SPARK Riversands High
- SPARK Rivonia Primary
- SPARK Rivonia High
- SPARK Rosslyn Hub Primary
- SPARK Rynfield Primary
- SPARK Silver Lakes Primary
- SPARK Soweto Primary
- SPARK Theresa Park Primary
- SPARK Turffontein Primary
- SPARK Weltevreden Park Primary
- SPARK Witpoortjie Primary

Western Cape, South Africa

- SPARK Blue Downs Primary
- SPARK Blue Downs High

== Funding ==
SPARK Schools has received funding both from foundations focused on high impact philanthropy and from for-profit impact investors. Funders/investors including CREADEV, Finnfund, Omidyar Network, Pearson Education (Pearson Affordable Learning Fund), the Good Schools Fund, Imaginable Futures and various high-net-worth individuals.

== Notable achievements ==
SPARK Schools was invited to the 2013 Skoll World Forum to present alongside Salman Khan (Khan Academy), Sandy Speicher (IDEO) and Debra Dunn (Stanford University) on the panel, Blended Learning: The Proof and the Promise.

SPARK Schools was recognised by the Accenture Innovation Index Awards as "an innovation that changes the way the world works" and placed as a finalist in the 2013 innovation index.

=== Awards ===
- 2014 Accenture Innovation Index Awards Finalist
- 2014 Mail and Guardian Top 200 South Africans
- 2015 South African Employer of Choice (<1000 employees)
- 2015 FNB Innovation Awards Finalist
- 2015 Elle Boss Awards
- 2015 Standard Bank Top Women Awards
- 2015 Mandela Washington Fellow
- 2016 EOY Innovator of the Year Award
- 2016 Acer for Education - Innovative School
- 2016 All Africa Business Leader Award (AABLA) - Innovator of the Year
- 2017 EY Entrepreneurial Winning Women
- 2017 Tutu Fellow
- 2019 Glamour Women of the Year (Business Category)
- 2022 Financial Times - Africa's fastest-growing Education company
- 2023 T4 Education World’s Best School winner
- 2024 Time Magazine’s top 250 EdTech companies worldwide
- 2024 The Charlotte Maxeke Annual Lecture and BHU Awards - Educational Advancement and Empowerment

== See also ==
- Rocketship Education (USA)
- Bridge International Academies (Kenya)
- Independent Schools Association of Southern Africa (ISASA)
- KIPP (USA)
- Uncommon Schools (USA)
