= Rebecca Winthrop =

American expert on global education

- Education: Swarthmore College (BA) Columbia University (MA, PhD)
- Occupation: Professor
- Employer: Brookings Institution

Rebecca Winthrop is an American expert on global education. She is currently the director of the Center for Universal Education at the Brookings Institution and an adjunct professor at Georgetown University's Walsh School of Foreign Service.

Winthrop served as a technical adviser and education expert at the International Rescue Committee from 2001 to 2009, overseeing education programs in twenty crisis-affected countries. In 2009, President Obama invited her to serve as an advisor to The White House Council on Women and Girls, and in 2012, Secretary-General Ban Ki-moon appointed her chair of the Global Education First Initiative's Technical Advisory Group formed to raise the political profile of global education.

Winthrop is a contributor to several periodicals and an author of books examining topics related to global education, humanitarian aid, sustainable development, and global citizenship, especially in India and Africa. Her most recent book is The Disengaged Teen: Helping Kids Learn Better, Feel Better, and Live Better (Penguin, 2024).

== Education ==
Winthrop obtained a BA from Swarthmore College in 1996, an MA from the School of International and Public Affairs at Columbia University in 2001, and a PhD. in 2008 from Teachers College, Columbia University.

== Career ==
From 2001 to 2009, Winthrop served as a senior technical advisor for education at the International Rescue Committee in New York. As the concurrent chair of the Inter-agency Network for Education in Emergencies, Winthrop developed an agenda designed to ensure education is not left off the global agenda, and was involved in implementing the first global standards for education in emergencies used in over one hundred countries. In 2009, Winthrop joined the Brookings Institution as a senior fellow.

At Brookings, Winthrop worked with Secretary of State Hillary Clinton's Office of Global Women's Issues to design a girls’ education collaborative focused on next generation gender equality. She also worked with President Obama's Office of Women and Girls’ and with the Office of the First Lady on the global girls’ education initiative. In 2014, Winthrop convened with UNESCO Institute of Statistics a global task force with participation from over one hundred countries to develop a shared agenda around prioritizing and measuring learning outcomes. The report contributed to the development of the United Nations Sustainable Development Goals. In 2019, Winthrop was appointed director of the Center for Universal Education.

== Selected bibliography ==
=== Books ===
- Anderson, J. and Winthrop, R. (2025). The Disengaged Teen: Helping Kids Learn Better, Feel Better, and Live Better. New York: Random House. ISBN 9780593727072, 059372707X
- Winthrop, R. (2018). Leapfrogging Inequality: Remaking Education to Help Young People Thrive. Washington DC: Brookings Institution Press. ISBN 9780815735717, 0815735715
- Sperling, G. and Winthrop, R. (2015). What Works in Girls’ Education: Evidence for the World’s Best Investment. Washington DC: Brookings Institution Press. ISBN 9780815728610, 0815728611

=== Journal articles ===
- Winthrop, R. (2016). How Can We “Leapfrog” Educational Outcomes? Stanford Social Innovation Review.
- Winthrop, R., and McGivney, E. (2016). Rethinking education in a changing world. Stanford Social Innovation Review, September 12.
- Winthrop, R., Anderson, L. and Cruzalegui, I. (2015). A review of policy debates around learning in the post-2015 education and development agenda. International Journal of Education Development, vol. 40.
- Winthrop, R. and Anderson Simons, K. (2013). Can International Large-Scale Assessments Inform a Global Learning Goal? Research in Comparative and International Education, vol. 8, issue 3.
- Winthrop, R. (2011). Education in Africa—The Story isn't Over. Current History, vol. 110.
- Winthrop, R. and Kirk. J. (2008). Learning for a Bright Future: Schooling, Armed conflict, and Children's Well-being. Comparative Education Review, vol. 52.
- Kirk, J. and Winthrop, R. (2008). Teaching for 'Tarbia': Home-based School Teachers in Afghanistan Teaching and Teacher Education. Teaching and Teacher Education, vol. 24.
- Kirk, J. and Winthrop, R. (2007). Promoting Quality Education in Refugee Contexts: Supporting Teacher Development in Northern Ethiopia. International Review of Education, Special Issue on Quality Education in Africa: Challenges & Prospects, vol. 53.
- Winthrop, R. (2006). Emergencies, education and innovation. Forced Migration Review, July.
- Kirk, J. and Winthrop, R. (2006). Home-based Schooling: Access to Quality Education for Afghan Girls. Journal of Education for International Development. 2:2.
- Kirk, J. and Winthrop, R. (2005). Addressing Gender-based Exclusion in Afghanistan: Home Schooling for Girls. Critical Half, Journal of Women for Women International, Fall.
- Winthrop, R. and Kirk, J. (2004). Teacher Development and Student Well-being. Forced Migration Review.
- Winthrop, R. (2003). Reflections on Working in Post-Conflict Afghanistan: Local versus International Perspectives of Gender Relations. Women's Studies Quarterly, Fall/Winter.
- Stichick, T., Winthrop, R., Smith, W., and Dunn, G. (2002). Emergency Education and Psychosocial Adjustment: Displaced Chechen Youth in Ingushetia. Forced Migration Review, October.

=== Policy reports ===
- Vegas, E., and Winthrop, R. (2020). “Global education: How to transform school systems?” In Reimagining the global economy: Building back better in a post-COVID-19 world. Report. The Brookings Institution.
- Winthrop, R., Ershadi, M., Angrist, N., and Matsheng, M. (2020). A historic shock to parental engagement in education: Parent perspectives in Botswana during COVID-19. Report. The Brookings Institution.
- Vegas, E., and Winthrop, R. (2020). Beyond reopening schools: How education can emerge stronger than before COVID-19. Report. The Brookings Institution.
- Winthrop, R. (2020) The need for civic education in 21st-century schools. Report. The Brookings Institution.
- Istance, D., Paniagua, A., Winthrop, R., and Ziegler, L. (2019). Learning to Leapfrog: Innovative pedagogies to transform education. Report. The Brookings Institution.
- Istance, D., R., Mackay, A., and Winthrop, R. (2019). Measuring Transformational Pedagogies Across G20 Countries to Achieve Breakthrough Learning: The Case for Collaboration. Report. G20 Japan 2019.
- Landscapes; Can urban planning and the learning sciences work together to help children? Report. The Brookings Institution.
- Winthrop, R. and Barton, A. (2018) The Potential to Leapfrog in Education: The Role of Innovation in Addressing Children’s Learning Needs in the Fourth Industrial Revolution. Report. IPAG.
- Winthrop, R. and Steer, L. (2014). Is the Global Partnership for Education Ready for Takeoff? Report. The Brookings Institution.
- Winthrop, R. and McGivney, E. (2014) Raising the Global Ambition for Girls’ Education. Report. The Brookings Institution.
- Winthrop, R., and Matsui, E. (2013). A New Agenda for Education in Fragile States. Report. The Brookings Institution.
- Winthrop, R., Dolan, J., Golden, A., and Ndaruhutse, S. (2012). Building Effective Teacher Salary Systems in Fragile and Conflict-Affected States. Report. The Brookings Institution and CfBT Education Trust.
- Winthrop, R. and Ferris, E. (2011). Education and Displacement: Assessing Conditions for Refugees and Internally Displaced Persons Affected by Conflict. Report. The Brookings Institution.
- Winthrop, R. Punching Below Its Weight: The U.S. Government Approach to Education in the Developing World. Report. The Brookings Institution.
- Klees, S.,Winthrop, R., and Adams, A. Many Paths to Universal Primary Education: Time to Replace the Indicative Framework with a Real Country Driven Approach. Report. The Brookings Institution, 2010.
- Winthrop, R. Education, Conflict, and Fragility: Past Developments and Future Challenges. UNESCO Background Paper, Education for All Global Monitoring Report 2011. November 2009.

== See also ==
- Appearances on C-SPAN
- Center for Universal Education
