= Seth Andrew =

American education entrepreneur and Obama White House Senior Advisor

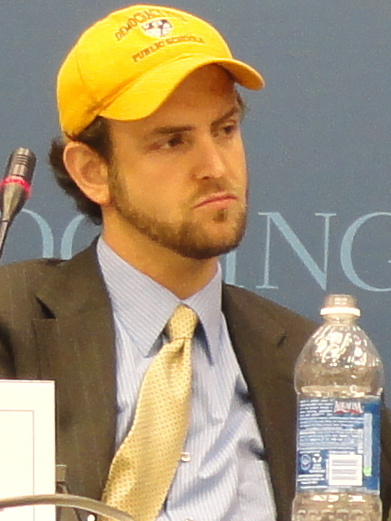
- Seth Andrew in 2012
- Born: 1979 (age 46–47)
- Education: Bronx High School of Science, A.B., Brown University, Ed.M., Harvard Graduate School of Education
- Occupations: Entrepreneur, Educator, Consultant

Seth Andrew (born 1979) is an American education entrepreneur who founded Democracy Prep Public Schools, a national network of public charter schools based in Harlem, and Democracy Builders, a social sector incubator that launched Washington Leadership Academy, the Arena Summit, Vote America, and Degrees of Freedom. He was an advisor to former President Barack Obama on education and civic tech and built vote.gov in 2015. In April 2021, Andrew was arrested on a criminal complaint for "Right to Control" wire fraud. He pled guilty to one charge in January 2022, and in July 2022 was sentenced to 366 days in prison while appealing his case. He was released in May 2023.

== Education ==
Andrew attended the Bronx High School of Science, earned his A.B. from Brown University, and his Ed.M from the Harvard Graduate School of Education and completed Y Combinator. He was a classroom teacher in South Africa, South Korea, and Massachusetts through 2005

== Career ==
=== Democracy Prep ===
In 2005, Andrew founded Democracy Prep Public Schools in Harlem, New York. The network has served more than 10,000 students in five states and DC. Democracy Prep has been the subject of significant academic research due to its emphasis on civic engagement and unique financial model that relies exclusively on public dollars. Roland Fryer and Will Dobbie found the network had the highest ROI for learning growth of any schools they studied at the time.

=== Obama White House ===
From 2014 to 2016, Andrew served as Senior Advisor and Superintendent-in-Residence at the U.S. Department of Education and was a Senior Advisor to Arne Duncan for Education Technology. Under the Presidency of Barack Obama, Andrew joined the White House in the Office of Science and Technology Policy working with the Domestic Policy Council to launch vote.gov. After leaving the White House, Andrew returned to Democracy Builders Project and won Laurene Powell Jobs' XQ Prize for Washington Leadership Academy. His work was featured on Vice.

=== New Globe & Bridge ===
From 2017 to 2018, Andrew was Global Director of Policy & Partnerships at Bridge International Academies. His work there was primarily to help launch the Partnership Schools for Liberia network with George Werner. The program is now called LEAP.

=== Degrees of Freedom ===
In 2020, under Andrew’s leadership, Democracy Builders and Marlboro College announced that Democracy Builders would acquire the Marlboro College campus in order to build a low-residency, low-cost college program for low-income students. The Degrees of Freedom program would last four years, from eleventh grade to the second year of college, and would result in an associate degree. The program was slated to include online, virtual reality, and in-person learning on campus for two weeks each trimester.

In February 2021, Andrew announced that Democracy Builders had sold the campus to leae back from "Type 1 Civilization Academy" via a quitclaim deed. On March 9, 2021, Andrew announced that the Type 1 deal had been cancelled. He called the agreement "an engagement" rather than "a marriage". Andrew filed another quit claim deed which transferred the property back to Democracy Builders. The principal of Type 1 appeared to be Adrian Stein who later settled with the Marlboro Music Festival. Degrees of Freedom stopped recruiting in the summer of 2021.

== Cancellation of Charter Leaders ==
In June 2020, Andrew and multiple national charter school leaders were the subject of coordinated allegations of "racism" by anonymous Instagram accounts. One social media account claimed that Andrew and his schools were built on an education system of systemic racism and manipulative behavior towards people of color. Andrew responded to the accusations in a June 24 post on Medium, which he later deleted. In the essay, Andrew apologized for his past mistakes and made commitments regarding his future conduct.

The Marlboro Alumni Council condemned Andrew, and called for the sale of the college to be cancelled. Despite the accusations, the Marlboro College Board of Trustees announced they would proceed with the sale following their investigation into the allegations. In July 2020, Andrew and members of Degrees of Freedom claimed that the anonymous "Black N Brown at DP" account was creating false narratives and stories in order to explicitly deter the purchase and transformation of the Marlboro College community.

== Arrest and Conviction ==
In April 2021, Andrew was arrested on a criminal complaint filed by Damian Williams and the SDNY. Initially, prosecutors alleged that Andrew embezzled funds from Democracy Prep escrow accounts in order to receive a .125% lower mortgage rate for a Manhattan apartment which he and his wife bought in August 2019. This claim was later withdrawn by the prosecution. Instead, prosecutors claimed that Andrew was feuding with the board and frustrated that the declining school network refused to rehire him as a consultant.

In January, 2022, Andrew allocated to one count of right to control wire fraud for moving, but not stealing, more than $200,000 from three bank accounts of dissolved charter schools to another non-profit entity he founded to benefit DPPS alumni, Alumni Revolution. On July 28, 2022, Andrew was sentenced to 366 days in prison by United States District Judge John P. Cronan in connection with his execution of a scheme. The DOJ conceded that the funds remained in escrow with Democracy Builders until his arrest and Judge Cronan's sentencing report indicates that Andrew had never used any funds for personal gain.

After the right to control theory of wire fraud was unanimously struck down by the US Supreme Court in Ciminelli, Andrew resumed his appeal. On Thursday, September 26, 2024, Seth Andrew's appeal of his conviction was dismissed by The Second Circuit Court of Appeals on the grounds that he had pled guilty to fraud prior to the ruling and was not entitled to relief.

== Personal life ==
Andrew is married to CBS News anchor Lana Zak. The couple have three children.
