= Global Engineering Education =

Global Engineering Education is a field of study that focuses on the impact of globalization on the engineering industry.

== History ==
Over the past decade or so educators and researchers have made an effort to transform engineering education in light of global trends in the profession. In 1985, the National Research Council issued a study that spotlighted the need for universities to graduate engineers with professional skills. This message was reinforced through a 1994 joint report published by the Engineering Deans Council and ASEE that stated, “Today, engineering colleges … must educate their students to work as part of teams, communicate well, and understand the economic, social, environmental and international context of their professional activities.”

== Definitions ==
=== Global Competency ===
Engineers increasingly operate in global and culturally diverse environments. The globalization of engineering work, including multinational collaborations, distributed project teams, and outsourcing of technical tasks, has increased the importance of intercultural communication and collaboration in professional engineering practice.

== Organizations ==
These are some organizations around the world that focus on global engineering education

- Purdue University, USA
- International Engineering Program at the University of Rhode Island
- RMIT University, Australia
- Centre for Engineering Education, Universiti Teknologi Malaysia, Malaysia
- Shanghai Jiao Tong University, China
- University of Karlsruhe (TH), Germany
- Worcester Polytechnic Institute, USA
- University of Florida, USA
- Virginia Polytechnic Institute and State University, USA
- University of Texas at Austin, Cockrell School of Engineering, USA
- University of Wisconsin–Madison, College of Engineering, USA
- University of British Columbia, Canada
- Spanish University of Distance Education - UNED, Electrical and Computer Engineering Department - DIEEC, Spain
- Deccan Herald
- Pforzheim University of Applied Sciences, Germany
- Kogakuin University, Tokyo, Japan
- Tokyo Global Engineering Corporation, Tokyo, Japan
- Ben-Gurion University of the Negev, Israel
- Texas A&M University, USA

== See also ==
  - Global Education Network Europe
