= Woodland (Washington, D.C.) =

Coordinates: 38.9206°N 77.0608°W

- Neighborhood of Washington, D.C.
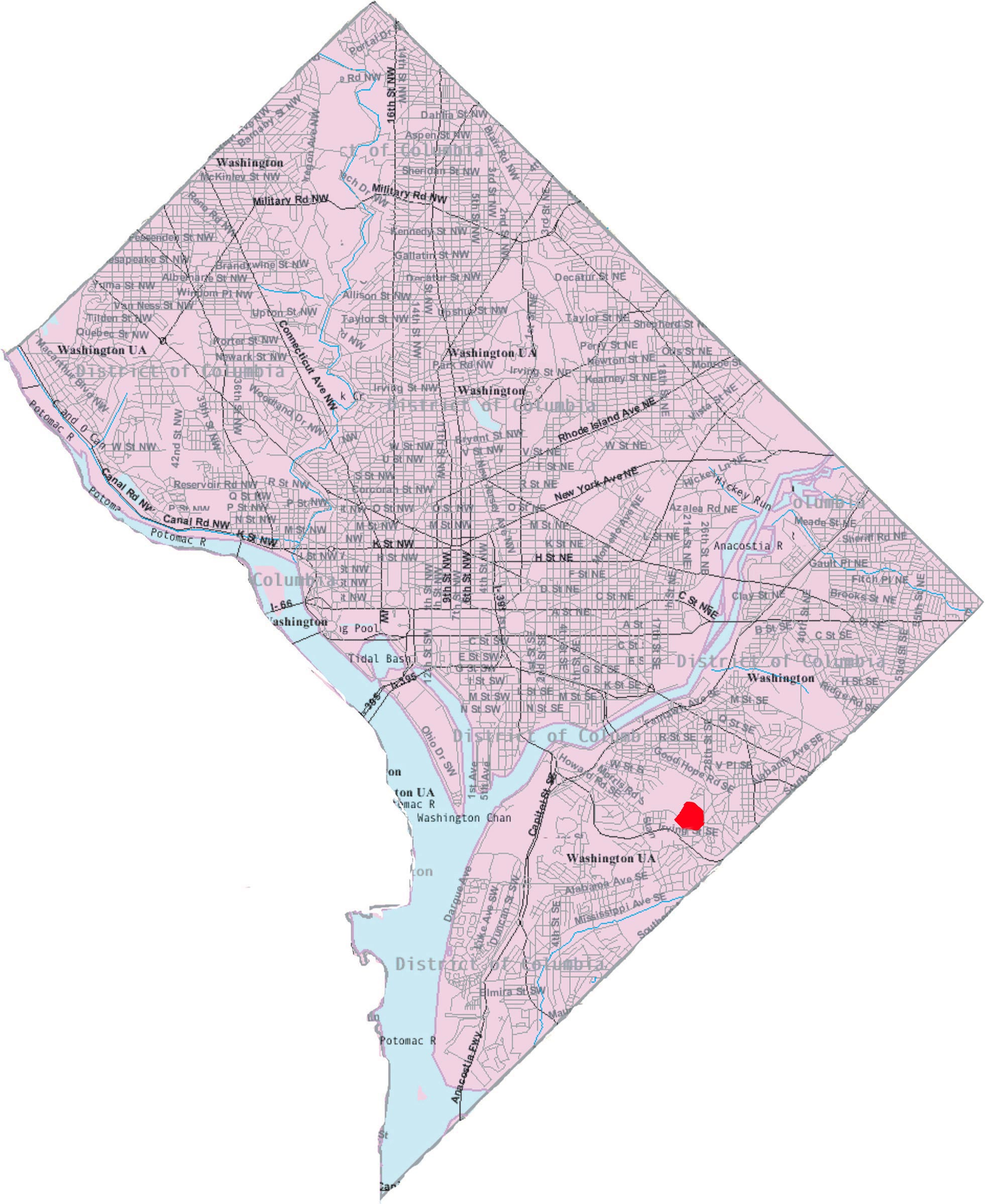
- Woodland within the District of Columbia
- Country: United States
- District: Washington, D.C.
- Ward: Ward 8

Government
  - Councilmember: Trayon White

Woodland is a small residential and industrial neighborhood in Southeast Washington, D.C. Woodland lies in Washington's Ward 8, among the poorest and least developed of the city's wards. Like the neighborhoods around it, Woodland is almost exclusively African American. Woodland is bounded by Ainger Place SE to the north; Alabama Avenue SE and Knox Place SE to the east; Hartford Street SE to the south; and Langston Place SE, Raynolds Place SE, and Erie Street SE to the southwest. Fort Stanton Park forms the northwest and northern border of the neighborhood.

== History of Woodland ==
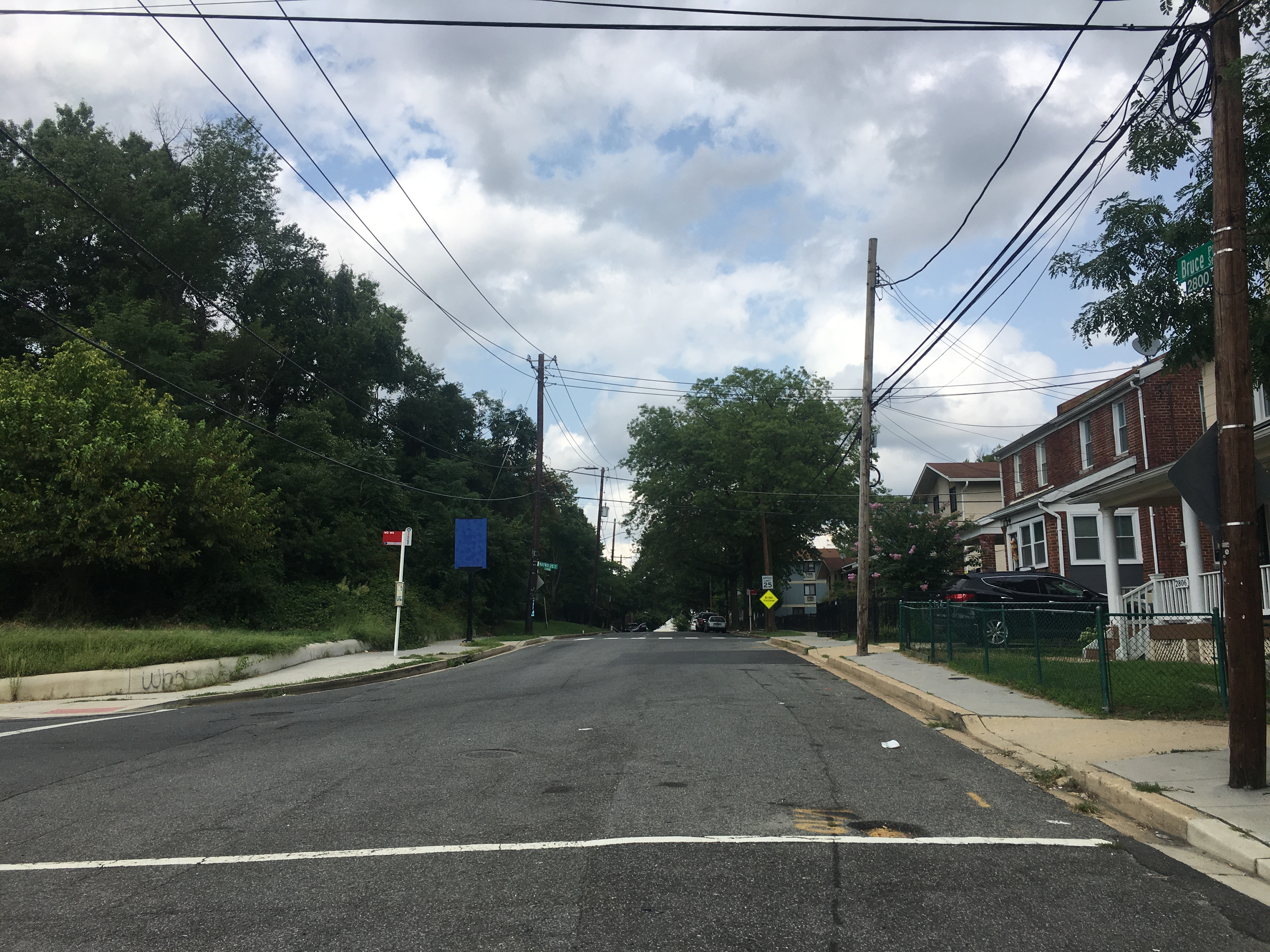
Woodland neighborhood at the intersection of Erie St and Bruce Pl SE, August 2018

Woodland is a very small neighborhood, with only four major streets.

As its name implies, Woodland was primarily a forested area. In June 1892, Emmanuel Baptist Church (known then as Emanuel Baptist Church) built its first structure on the southern corner of Ainger and Langston Place SE. Young's Memorial Church of Christ Holiness was established in October 1925 where Alabama Avenue SE and Knox Place SE meet.

The neighborhood remained largely undeveloped until the 1960s, when a large number of public housing complexes were built. One of the first and largest dwellings to be erected was the 234-unit Woodland Terrace, built on the large city block bounded by Ainger, Langston, Bruce, and Raynolds Places SE. It was originally intended to house poverty-stricken senior citizens. It began construction in 1962, and was ready for occupancy at the end of 1964. But when finished, it was occupied primarily by families with children. The 188-unit Langston Lane Apartments (2726 Langston Place SE) were completed in 1971. These apartments were built partly with federal money, and were heavily subsidized so they could provide affordable housing to the poor. But the Langston Lane Apartments were also strongly criticized for being poorly planned and constructed.

Several other apartment complexes were also built in Woodland, although not all of these remained dedicated to residential use. In 1979, about eight small brick apartment buildings between 2840 and 2920 Langston Place SE were purchased Hope Village, a halfway house providing residential living for people with mental illness, drug addiction, alcoholism, and other issues. In time, Hope Village also served as a prerelease center for D.C. Jail and some federal prison inmates awaiting parole before being formally released. Hope Village was a troubled facility. Other the years, it was accused of misspending Medicaid and Social Security funds (although no formal charges were made), dangerous overcrowding, providing too few staff, delivering little to none of the mandated medical care, permitting unsanitary conditions, a lack of heat, providing too little food, and failing to pay its taxes. The 250-bed facility was also accused of worsening the incidence of crime in the area and failing to protect its LGBTQ clients from attacks by other inmates.

In August 2014, Rocketship Education announced it would construct a charter school at the corner of Bruce Place SE and Erie Street SE. Local residents criticized the location, saying it was unsafe for children, but the company said it would open the school (which already had city approval) in the fall of 2016.

As of 2015, about 600 families lived in Woodland, and a third of all people there were children or teenagers.

== Poverty and crime ==
The residents of Woodland are overwhelmingly poor, and The Washington Post has called the neighborhood is "a persistent pocket of crime." Shootings, armed robberies, and assaults are common. Open-air drug markets operated on the streets at night. Drug dealers often shoot out street lights, and the District of Columbia Housing Authority (the city agency which owns and operates public housing in the neighborhood) now provides street lighting from rooftop lights. Street-level portable floodlights are used when the rooftop lighting is vandalized, forcing the Metropolitan Police Department to post armed guards around them.

From January 2000 to August 2015, 29 people were murdered in the neighborhood. In August 2015, four people were killed in Woodland, and the Metropolitan Police flooded the area with uniformed police for more than a week in order to stem the wave of violence.

== Amenities ==
The Anacostia Community Museum, a constituent museum of the Smithsonian Institution, is located adjacent to Woodland on Erie Street SE. The Fort Stanton Recreation Center and Avalon Playground are located next to the museum at 1812 Erie Street SE. The District of Columbia Department of Parks and Recreation-owned and -operated facility provides a computer lab, fitness center, gymnasium, and multi-purpose room. An outdoor pool, playground, basketball courts, baseball diamond, athletic field, and picnic tables are also available.

The Woodland Community Center, a small city-owned and operated community center, is located at 2310 Ainger Place SE. It was constructed about 1965. While running for office in 2006, future D.C. Mayor Adrian Fenty held a campaign debate at the Woodland Community Center.

Stanton Elementary School, located a block northwest of the neighborhood at 2701 Naylor Road SE, serves area children from PreK to the fifth grade. It was considered a "failing school" in 2010, at which time the District of Columbia Public Schools allowed the Scholar Academies school management company to take it over.

Allen Chapel African Methodist Episcopal Church, a historic African American congregation founded in 1850, is located adjacent to the western tip of Woodland at 2498 Alabama Avenue SE. President Barack Obama worshipped there on Easter Sunday in 2010.

== In popular culture ==
A portion of Derek Shield's 2015 novel, Tygers Eye, takes place in Woodland.

Much of Season 6, Episode 9 ("The Doctor in the Photo") of the TV series, "Bones," takes place in or references Woodland. Woodland is described as a rough neighborhood where the murder victim is found and it is implied throughout the episode that she sought out the neighborhood for its danger.

== Bibliography ==
- Committee on Appropriations (1970). District of Columbia Appropriations for 1971. Part 2. U.S. House of Representatives. 91st Cong., 2d sess. Washington, D.C.: U.S. Government Printing Office. hdl:2027/mdp.39015069455163.
- Shield, Derek (2015). Tygers Eye. Pfafftown, N.C.: Traveling North. ISBN 9780989346634.
- Smith, Kathryn Schneider (2010). Washington At Home: An Illustrated History of Neighborhoods in the Nation's Capital. Baltimore, Md.: Johns Hopkins University Press. ISBN 9780801893537.
