= Trade Union Congress of Kenya =

Trade Union Congress
- Trade Union Congress of Kenya
- Founded: 2012
- Headquarters: Nairobi, Kenya
- Location: Kenya
- Key people: Wilson Sossion

The Trade Union Congress of Kenya is a trade union that was registered to represent the interests of public sector workers. It was originally founded as the Federation of Public Service Trade Unions of Kenya. It was established as an umbrella body for unions such as Kenya National Union of Teachers (KNUT), Union of Kenya Civil Servants (UKCS); Universities Academic Staff Union (UASU); Kenya Universities Staff Union (KUSU); Kenya Dock Workers Union (KDWU); Kenya Tertiary and Schools Workers’ Union; and the Kenya Independent Commissions Workers’ Union (KICOWU). In 2018 it publicly backed a strike action by university leacturers over the implementation of a Collective bargaining agreement. The Federation suffered setbacks with leadership wrangles leading to the withdrawal of key members such as KNUT.
