= Bronx Preparatory Charter School =

Public school in New York City

The Bronx Preparatory Charter School

Location
- 3872 3rd Ave; Bronx, New York 10457; United States; 40°50′20.72″N 73°54′0.34″W

Information
- Type: Public (Charter) Middle High
- Established: 2000
- Dean: Ms. Monahan
- Principal: Mr. Gil and Ms. Philpott
- Faculty: 41
- Grades: 6–12
- Affiliation: Democracy Prep
- Website: bphs.democracyprep.org

Bronx Preparatory Charter School is a public middle and high school in the South Bronx. Comprising students in grades 5-12, Bronx Prep graduated its first class of seniors in June 2007. The school is located in a facility designed and constructed by GLUCK+ Architects specifically for Bronx Prep.

== History ==
The founder of Bronx Prep is Kristin Kearns Jordan. She was also the first executive director of Bronx Prep until 2007. Dr. Samona Tait-Johnson took over at that time. The position of director was subsequently renamed Head of School. Following Dr. Tait's tenure, Edwina Branch Smith served as Head of School. Nancy Garvey and Debbie Evangelakos, both Bronx Prep Board members at the time, then served as interim Co-Heads of School. In 2014 the school was taken over by the charter school organization Democracy Prep, and is now called Democracy Prep Bronx Prep.

Bronx Prep opened its doors in 2000 with its inaugural class of 100 5th and 6th graders. As one of fourteen schools chartered by the SUNY Charter Schools Institute out of ninety applicants in 1999, Bronx Prep was one of the first schools to be re-chartered for a full five-year term in 2004. In 2004 the school moved to the new building designed and built for it.

== Extracurricular activities ==
Bronx Prep students participate in extracurricular activities in the Charter School Athletics League and the National Forensics League. Some extracurricular activities at Bronx Prep combine the middle school and high school.

Extracurricular Activities available at Bronx Prep include: Theater, Student Council, Speech/Forensics, Math Team, Science Olympiad, Seekers Club, National Honor Society, Cheerleading, Middle School and High School Boys and Girls Basketball, Soccer (Boys and Girls), Girls Volleyball, Baseball, Softball, and Flag football (Co-Ed).
