= Deutsche Schule Durban =

Private school in South Africa

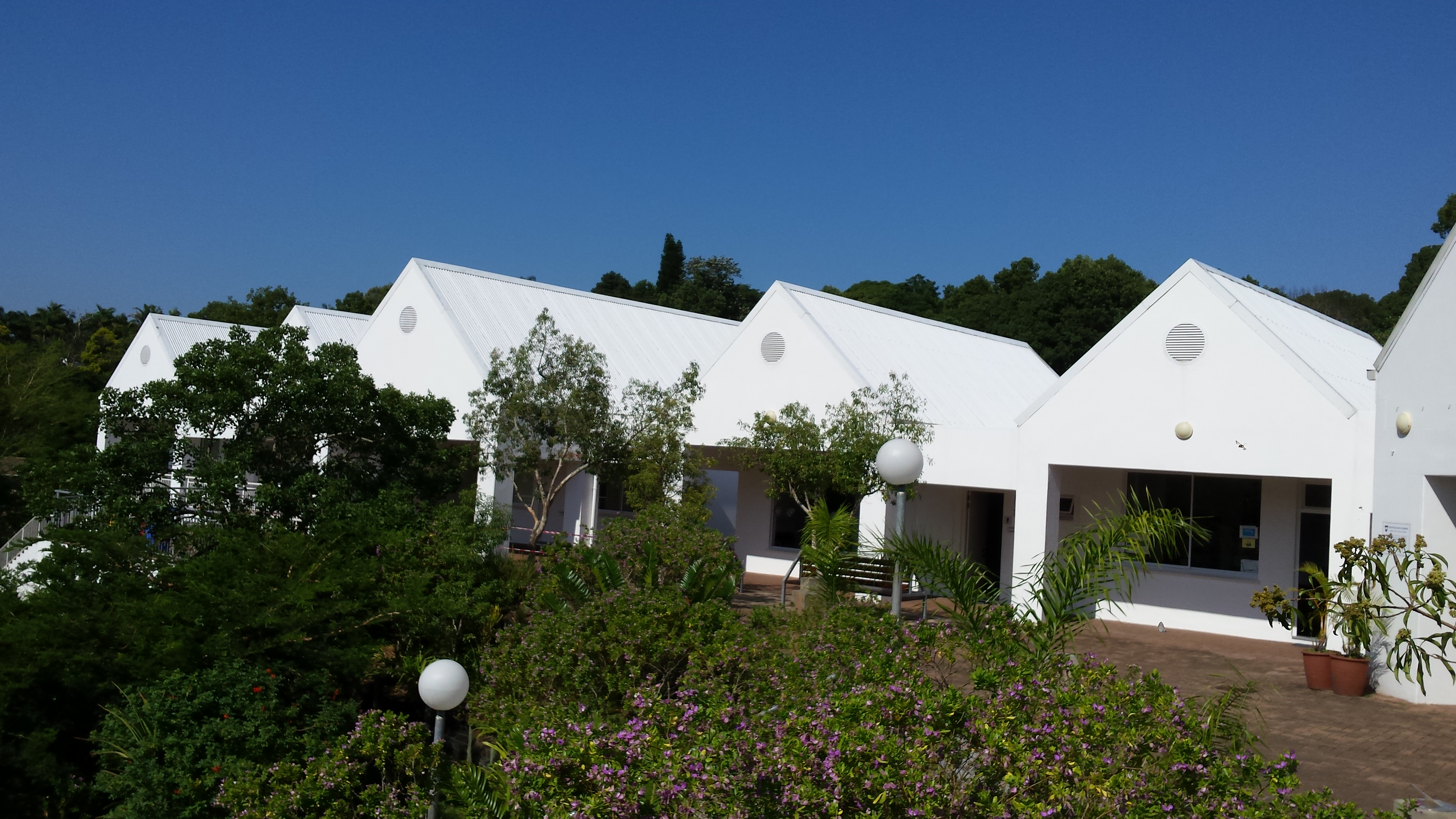
- Deutsche Schule Durban buildings

Location
- Westville, KwaZulu-Natal; South Africa
- Coordinates: 29°49′15.77″S 30°54′30.95″E

Information
- School type: German language based education
- Established: 1971; 55 years ago
- Educational authority: Independent Schools Association of Southern Africa
- Grades: 18 months to 7th grade
- Enrollment: 150 (2019)
- Language: German; English; Afrikaans (from class 4); Zulu (from class 5)
- Website: dsdurban.co.za

The Deutsche Schule Durban (DSD) is a private German school in the suburb of Westville, west of Durban, KwaZulu-Natal, South Africa. It educates children from 18 months to the 7th grade in German and also teaches from grades 5 to 7 in English.

The school was founded in 1971 to teach students from kindergarten to grade 7. The school belongs to the Independent Schools Association of Southern Africa. Most of the 150 pupils come from a household in which at least one of the parents speaks German. The school receives no financial support from the South African or German governments.

The preschool program offers around 45 German and non-German students between the ages of three and six the opportunity to learn the language.

Courses are taught in German up to grade 4, but from grades 5 to 7, English with monthly German classes is the norm. English is offered as a subject from grade 3 onward, and Afrikaans from grade 4. Grades 6 through 7 students are also taught courses in Zulu.
