= Bridge International Academies =

For-profit education company

- Knowledge For All
- Type: For-profit education
- Genre: Low cost private schools
- Founded: 2009
- Founder: Shannon May, Jay Kimmelman, Phil Frei
- Headquarters: Nairobi, Kenya
- Area served: India, Kenya, Nigeria, Uganda
- Website: http://www.bridgeinternationalacademies.com/

Bridge International Academies is a company which provides for-profit education to children in India, Kenya, Nigeria and Uganda. It was started in 2008, and calls itself a "social enterprise". By 2022, Bridge had around 750,000 students in its schools. As of March 2023, it is the world's largest for-profit primary education chain. Its parent company is NewGlobe Schools, Inc.

== History ==
Shannon May, her husband Jay Kimmelman, and Phil Frei, a former roommate of Kimmelman's co-founded Bridge International Academies and opened the first school in Nairobi, Kenya in 2008. By 2022, Bridge had around 750,000 students in its schools. As of March 2023, Bridge has schools in Uganda, Nigeria, Liberia, and India in addition to Kenya, and is the world's largest for-profit primary education chain.

Bridge opened a London, UK office.

In 2016, Bridge opened six schools in Andhra Pradesh, India in a partnership with the Government of Andhra Pradesh to use disused school buildings to create Bridge schools.

Bridge won the 2016 Global Shared Value award in Kenya.

In 2016, Bridge expanded to Liberia as part of the Liberian Education Advancement Program (LEAP) that selected eight private companies to take over 93 public schools. Bridge started with running 23 schools, and as of February 2023, it runs about 360 of 487 LEAP schools.

Costs for bridge schools net losses and revenues are estimated and are not released by the firm, with losses in 2016 estimated $12m a year and with a total revenue of $16m / year.

In 2017, the number of Bridge academies in Lagos, Nigeria increased. Bridge removed pupils after taking control of schools with large class sizes, and removed 74% of incumbent teachers from their schools.

=== Legal issues ===
In November 2014, the Busia County, Kenya education board decided to close ten Bridge schools in the county for their substandard safety and accountability records. Upon moving to enforce the decision in 2016, Bridge sued the board and its director on procedural grounds. In February 2017, the High Court in Busia ruled in favor of the board.

In May 2016, Bridge accused Curtis Riep, a University of Alberta PhD candidate in the Department of Educational Policy Studies, of trespassing and impersonating its staff. Riep was in Uganda to research Bridge for a study commissioned by Education International and was arrested by Ugandan police immediately after arriving for an interview with two Bridge executives. Bridge had put ads in the local newspaper asking people to notify police if they saw Riep. Riep was able to show Ugandan police that he had signed the visitor logs at Bridge facilities under his own name and was released the following day. Riep and the Ugandan teacher's federation said that Bridge had arranged the detention to stop his research. In December, Bridge filed a complaint with the University of Alberta claiming ethical violations. Riep ultimately earned his doctorate from the university in 2021.

In November 2016, the High Court of Uganda ruled that the national government could close the 63 Bridge schools in the country because they were operating without required licenses. Bridge is appealing the order, and the schools remain open as of March 2023.

In March 2017, Bridge sued the Kenya National Union of Teachers (KNUT) and Wilson Sossion, its secretary general, for defamation over its publication of a 2016 report critical of Bridge's practices in the country. In February 2018, the Kenyan High Court dismissed an application for an interim injunction barring KNUT and its leadership from criticizing Bridge.

==== Sexual misconduct and safety incidents in Kenya ====
In 2015, a Bridge teacher in Mombasa was convicted of cutting a seven-year-old student's genitals in 2013 and sentenced to life in prison by the High Court.

According to a March 2023 report by The Intercept, in 2016 a teacher at a Bridge school in the Mukuru slums of Nairobi had sexually assaulted at least 11 girls between the ages of 10 and 14 since at least 2015. The teacher in question admitted his guilt to school staff but was never reported to police or Bridge executives by the academy manager. A Bridge spokesperson confirmed to The Intercept that the incident had occurred and Bridge warned the outlet about potential legal action if the story was published. In 2017, a teacher from another school in Mukuru was arrested for allegedly sexually harassing female students.

In March 2018, EACHRights, a Kenyan non-profit, submitted a formal complaint about Bridge to the Compliance Advisor/Ombudsman, an accountability office within the World Bank. In April 2020, after discussions with African stakeholders, Representative Maxine Waters, the chair of the United States House Committee on Financial Services, made the funding the World Bank was seeking from Congress conditional on the International Finance Corporation looking into divesting from Bridge. After divestment in March 2022, the IFC retained an indirect $200,000 stake in Bridge through their role as a limited partner in an investment fund. In December 2020, a preliminary report by the CAO recommended a full investigation into multiple allegations of sexual abuse of Bridge students by teachers in Kenya, which is expected to be published in Fall 2023, along with an investigation into health and safety practices.

After the 2016 abuse story came to light, Bridge created a Critical Incident Advisory Unit, added additional training on preventing grooming, and asked staff to re-sign the "Child champion promise" in 2020. Bridge also fired the school manager who did not report the crimes. Bridge also commissioned a 2020 report reviewing its processes, which found that Bridge academy managers were insufficiently trained and not aware of the resources Bridge provided in these cases. The report also found that Kenyan public schools had higher rates of rates of abuse than Bridge, though it compared anonymous survey results in public schools, to investigated cases in Bridge schools.

In 2019, a student at another school in Nairobi was fatally electrocuted at a Bridge school after touching an exposed live wire. Bridge reached a settlement with the student's mother which did not require it to apologise.

== Structure ==
Bridge is managed through a centralised system in each country, lowering the administrative costs for operating individual schools. Each Bridge school has only one administrative staff member, known as an Academy Manager, headteacher or Principal, who manages the school through a smartphone loaded with a custom-developed application that connects managers to a central cloud-based server.

The rate of teacher absenteeism for Bridge schools is documented at less than 1%, whereas in Kenyan public schools according to World Bank research, absenteeism in the classroom is 47.3%.

=== Funding and investors ===
Bridge has received funding from a number of investors, including:

- Bill & Melinda Gates Foundation
- Commonwealth Development Corporation
- Department for International Development, whose British International Investment institution decided to divest following a 2017 report by the International Development Committee of the House of Commons describing Bridge as "a contentious partner"
- International Finance Corporation, which divested all but a $200,000 indirect stake by 2022
- Kholsa Ventures
- New Enterprise Associates
- Omidyar Network
- Overseas Private Investment Corporation
- Chan Zuckerberg Initiative
- Pershing Square Foundation

== Awards ==
- In 2012, Africa Awards for Entrepreneurship for Outstanding Small and Growing Business Award by the African Leadership Network.
- In addition to both being named on the CNBC Next List 2014.
- In 2015, WISE (World Innovation Summit in Education) Award
- Economist Innovation Award
- Overseas Private Investment Corporation Development Impact Award
- Fast Company World's Top 10 Most Innovative Companies
- Featured in a report by the Brookings Institution, Center for Universal Education entitled Millions learning: Scaling up quality education in developing countries.
- African Business Employer of Choice Award 2018
- ACQ5 Award: Education Company of the Year (Africa)

== Criticism ==
Bridge has received criticism from different sources, including teaching unions and education rights groups. Education groups have pushed back on Bridge as using a model that stifles creativity, innovation, and goes against educational research in developed countries. Critics have been accused of putting 'ideology before education'.

After the president of the World Bank Jim Yong Kim praised Bridge Schools in 2015, there was a large push-back from organisations in Kenya and Uganda, disagreeing with his statement. They expressed deep concern over the global financial institution's investment in a chain of private primary schools targeting poor families in Kenya and Uganda and called on the institution to support free universal education instead.

Others have argued that their model, focused on guided instruction, actually enhances creativity similar to the way musicians use sheet music or actors have scripts.

The company has come under criticism from aid agencies and civil rights groups, including ActionAid and Education for All, for being detrimental to the plan of offering a “universal, free and compulsory basic education” to all children. Education International (EI), a global group of teachers’ unions, has criticised Bridge for its for-profit model being “morally wrong.”

Global Justice Now has criticised Bridge by suggesting that “the cost per student at just $6 dollars a month” is misleading. It states that 'the suggestion that $6 is an acceptable amount of money for poor households to pay reveals a profound lack of understanding of the reality of the lives of the poorest”. Global Justice Now calculated that for half their populations, the $6 per month per child it would cost to send three primary school age children to a Bridge Academy, is equal to at least a quarter of their monthly income. Many families already struggle to provide three meals a day to their children. It has also claimed that the real total cost of sending one child to a Bridge school is between $9 and $13 a month, and up to $20 when including school meals.
