= John Danner (entrepreneur) =

John W. Danner
- Born: August 18, 1966 (age 59)
- Education: Stanford University, Vanderbilt University
- Occupations: Co-founder and CEO - Flourish Schools
- Spouse: Suzanne Dix Danner (married 2024 - present) née Keltner Araujo Allison Marston Danner (married 1999 - 2020)

John W. Danner (born August 18, 1966) is an American educator and entrepreneur who currently runs Flourish Schools. He also founded NetGravity, Rocketship Education, Zeal Learning, Dunce Capital, ProjectRead.ai and SparkSpace.ai. He is currently the CEO of Flourish Schools and Chairman of ProjectRead, which teaches students to read using AI. He was the cofounder of Rocketship Education, where he was CEO from 2006 to 2013. He cofounded NetGravity in 1995, which was the world's first advertising server company.

== Education and career ==
Danner received his Bachelor’s of Science in Electrical Engineering from Stanford University in 1988. He went on to receive his Master’s of Science from Stanford in Electrical Engineering in 1992 while working as a Software Engineer at Oracle Corporation.

After receiving his bachelor's degree, Danner started his career as a Software Engineer at Tandem Computers, where he remained from June 1988 to June 1990. At Tandem, he built the front-end for Tandem’s design environment as well as CAD tools used by Tandem to make new computers. Following his tenure at Tandem, Danner worked as a Software Engineer at Oracle Corporation. After Oracle, Danner went on to work at Silicon Graphics, where he worked as a Software Engineer on Jim Clark's project to build the Nintendo 64 and Time Warner fiber to the curb project (Full Service Network).

In August 1995, Danner cofounded NetGravity, where he was CEO until August 1999. NetGravity was the first ad server company. It made software that helped large media companies and websites manage Internet advertising. The company had an initial public offering in June 1998 and was sold to DoubleClick in 1999 for $750 million.

After the sale of NetGravity, Danner became a teacher. He completed a Master’s of Education in Education Policy in 2002 at Vanderbilt University. After receiving his degree from Vanderbilt, Danner went on to work as a public school teacher in Nashville, Tennessee from 2002 to 2005.

In 2006, Danner cofounded Rocketship Public Schools, where he was CEO from 2005 to 2013. Rocketship combines classroom and online teaching. Rocketship has educated over 30,000 students and currently operates 23 schools in 5 states, educating over 10,000 students each year.

In February 2013, Danner cofounded Zeal Learning. Zeal Learning was an online math tutoring company. By combining live coaches and machine learning, Zeal reduced the cost of math tutoring, effectively solving Bloom's Two Sigma Problem.

Danner sold Zeal in 2018 and began actively angel investing. At the end of 2018, he started a venture capital fund, Dunce Capital, focused on idea and pre-seed investments in the future of learning and work (FLW). Dunce has made over 50 early investments in companies like outschool, Synthesis, stepful, contra, and SchoolAI.

Starting in 2021, Danner formed a studio to create new startups focused on education. His first company, ProjectRead.ai, co-founded with Vivek Ramakrishnan, creates decodable stories for children learning to read with a Science of Reading curriculum. ProjectRead also tutors students in reading using AI. As of the 2023-24 school year, it was being used with 100,000 students. His second company, SparkSpace.ai, was co-founded with David Vinca, focusing on using AI to help students with their writing.

Starting in 2024, Danner began teaching Lean Launchpad for Education at Stanford University with Jennifer Carolan and Emma Brunskill. The class requires students to form teams and apply to participate in the class. This work builds on Danner's work with founders to intentionally find Product Market Fit.

In 2025, Danner co-founded Flourish Schools with Adam Nadeau. Flourish is a network of microschools for middle schoolers, reinventing the classroom by using AI to allow for measuring previously unmeasurable soft-skills which Flourish calls SuperPowers.

== See also ==
- DreamBox (company)
