= Center for Universal Education =

Council on Foreign Relations

Founded in 2002 by Gene Sperling, the Center for Universal Education is a policy center at the Brookings Institution focused on universal quality education particularly in the developing world. Originally a think tank for the Council on Foreign Relations, it moved to the Brookings Institution in 2009. The center works to influence the development of policy related to global education and promotes actionable strategies for governments, civil society and private enterprise. Through its research, policy engagement, and convening, the Brookings Institution's Center for Universal Education aims to inform the global education agenda, advance learning metrics, improve education resources and learning outcomes, and reach marginalized groups.

The Center for Universal Education is engaged in four broad areas: Improving learning and skills, addressing inequality, achieving learning at scale, and supporting effective and equitable education financing.

== Projects ==
=== Millions Learning ===
The Millions Learning project seeks to identify where and how education interventions are scaling quality learning for children and youth in low- and middle- income countries around the world.

In 2016, the Center released the 'Millions learning: Scaling up quality education in developing countries' report and the 'Millions Learning Case Studies' to share about effective learning interventions that are being scaled up around the world. The study focused on Aflatoun, Bridge International Academies, Educate!, INJAZ, Lesson Study, Media Center, Pratham, Room to Read, Sesame Street, Sistema de Aprendizaje Tutorial, Teach For All, and Worldreader.

=== Skills for a Changing World ===
Skills for a Changing World is a project of the Center for Universal Education at Brookings and the LEGO Foundation that provides research and materials to help all children have high-quality learning opportunities, which lead to the development of skills needed to create a productive, healthy life in the face of changing social, technological, and economic demands.
