= Wilson Sossion =

Kenyan politician

Honorable Wilson Sossion

Nominated Member of National Assembly
- Incumbent
- Assumed office 31st August 2017

Secretary General Trade Union Congress of Kenya
- In office 2017–2018

Secretary General KNUT
- In office 2013–2021
- Preceded by: David Okuta Osiany
- Succeeded by: Collins Oyuu

Personal details
- Born: 1969 (age 56–57) Merigi, Bomet County, Kenya
- Party: UDA
- Spouse: Vivianne Kenduiywa
- Children: 3
- Education: Egerton University
- Occupation: Politician
- Profession: Teacher

Wilson Sossion is a Kenyan legislator and teacher who as of 2021 is a nominated member of Parliament representing workers' interests in Kenya's National Assembly. Politically he is affiliated to United Democratic Alliance (UDA). He also served as the Secretary General of Kenya National Union of Teachers (KNUT) from 2013 to 2021.

== Background and education ==
Sossion was born and raised in Kenya in 1969 in Pokot county, and is a member of Tulin clan. His family later moved to Bomet County in the 1970s. He graduated from Egerton University with Bachelor of Arts Degree in Education. He later joined Kenya National Union of Teachers in 2013 taking over from David Osiany He attended the great Tenwek High School in Bomet County alongside other dignitaries.

== Career ==
=== Teaching and KNUT ===
Sossion started his career as a teacher in 1993 at Tenwek High School in Bomet. In 2000, Sossion vied for the position of Executive Secretary for the Bomet branch of Kenya National Union of Teachers (KNUT) but he lost. He vied again in 2001 and won. Shortly after that, he was elected to the National Union Council where he was exposed to matters policy and decision-making. In 2007, he contested for the post of second vice national chairman of KNUT and won. He later vied for the position of chair and was elected unopposed. He rose to the position of National chair position and in 2013, members asked him to serve as Secretary General of the same organization. Having served as Secretary General for KNUT for eight years, Sossion resigned in June 2021. He indicated that he wanted to focus on legislative duties.

=== Politics ===
In 2017, he was nominated to the Kenya National Assembly by Orange Democratic Movement (ODM) party to represent workers' interests.

== See also ==
- Raila Odinga
- Kenya National Assembly
- Bomet County
