= Gene Sperling =

American economist (born 1958)

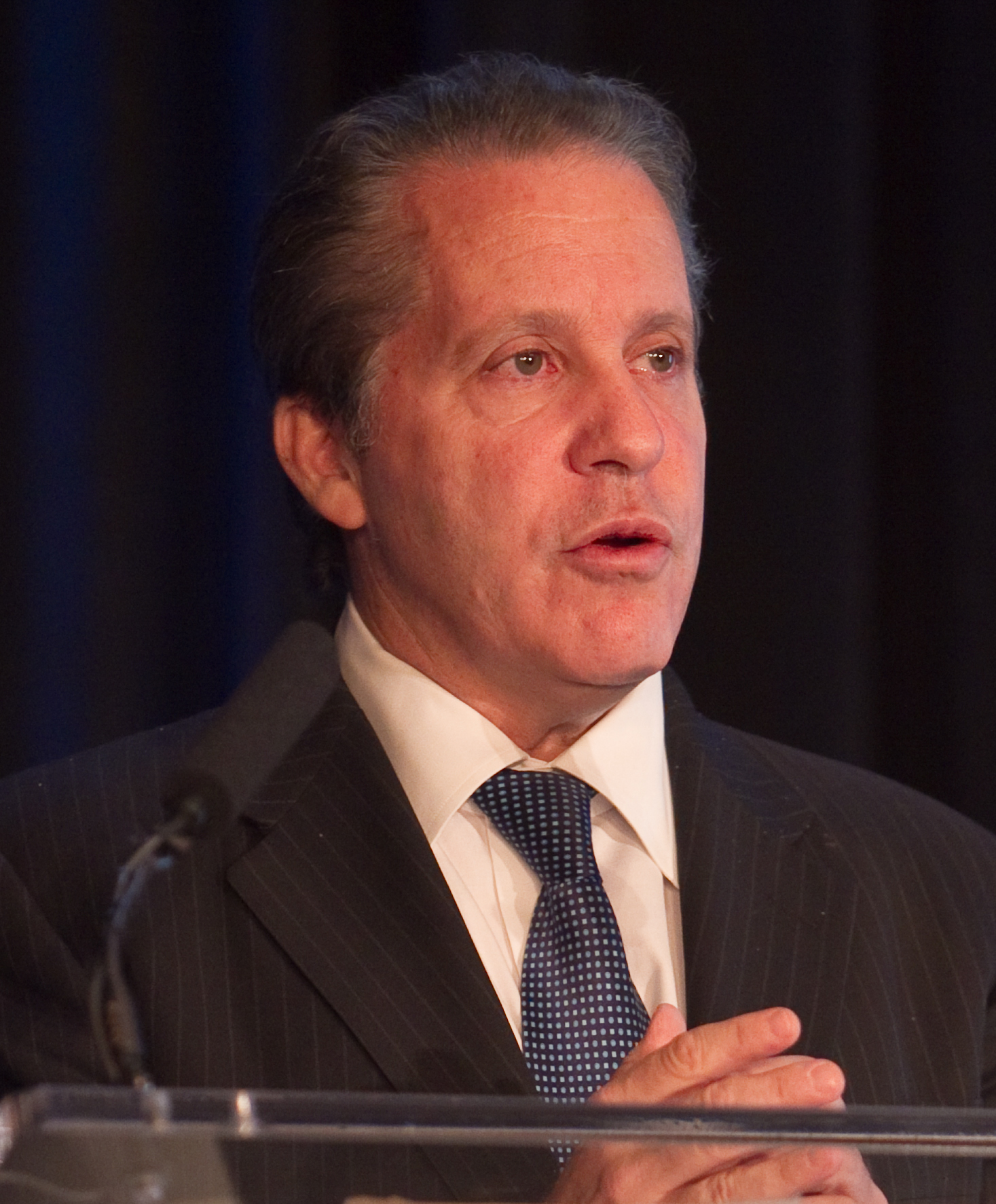

3rd and 9th Director of the National Economic Council
- In office January 20, 2011 – March 5, 2014
- President: Barack Obama
- Preceded by: Larry Summers
- Succeeded by: Jeff Zients
- In office December 12, 1996 – January 20, 2001
- President: Bill Clinton
- Preceded by: Laura Tyson
- Succeeded by: Lawrence B. Lindsey

Personal details
- Born: Eugene Benton Sperling; December 24, 1958 (age 67) Ann Arbor, Michigan, U.S.
- Party: Democratic
- Spouse: Allison Abner
- Children: 2
- Education: University of Minnesota (BA); Yale University (JD); University of Pennsylvania (attended)

Eugene Benton Sperling (born December 24, 1958) is an American lawyer who was director of the National Economic Council and assistant to the president for economic policy under Presidents Bill Clinton and Barack Obama. He is the only person to serve as national economic advisor under two presidents. Outside of government, he founded the Center for Universal Education at the Brookings Institution in 2002.

In February 2021, as the nomination of Neera Tanden for OMB director faced opposition, Sperling was considered to be one of the leading contenders to assume the top position. Sperling served as Senior Advisor to President Joe Biden and Implementation Coordinator of the American Rescue Plan. On August 5, 2024, the White House announced that Sperling was leaving the administration to work with the Vice President Kamala Harris' election campaign.

== Early life and education ==
Sperling was born in Ann Arbor, Michigan, the son of Doris Louise (née Hyman) and Lawrence Sperling. He is of Jewish descent. He attended Pioneer High School and then Community High School, from which he graduated. In 1982, he graduated with a B.A. in political science from the University of Minnesota, where he was captain of the Men's Varsity Tennis Team. In 1985 he graduated with a juris doctor from Yale Law School where he served as a senior editor of the Yale Law Journal. While at Yale Law School, he worked for future Labor Secretary Robert Reich. He also attended the Wharton School of the University of Pennsylvania and worked as an economic adviser on Michael Dukakis' campaign.

Prior to joining the National Economic Council, Sperling served as deputy director of economic policy for the presidential transition and economic policy director of the Clinton-Gore presidential campaign. From 1990 to 1992, he was an economic advisor to Governor Mario Cuomo of New York.

== Career ==
=== Clinton administration ===
Sperling served as deputy director (from 1993 to 1996) and then director (from 1996 to 2001) of the National Economic Council during the Clinton administration. As deputy director from 1993 to 1996, Sperling helped design and pass several of President Bill Clinton's early initiatives, including 1993 Deficit Reduction Act, the major expansion of the Earned Income Tax Credit, and the Direct Student Loan Act.

As director from 1996 to 2001, Sperling was a principal negotiator of the 1997 bipartisan Balanced Budget Act, which included the creation of the Children's Health Insurance Program. He reportedly held up the final negotiation to ensure that the design of the child tax credit would lead to bigger payments for lower-income families on the Earned Income Tax Credit. He also played a leading role in the design and passage of other Clinton administration economic initiatives, including the Hope Scholarship Tax Credit, the New Markets Tax Credit, the Children's Health Insurance Program, the Gear-UP Early College Mentoring program, expanded debt relief to poor nations, and stronger international protections against abusive child labor. He was the architect of the Save Social Security First budget strategy, and co-negotiated the final week of the China WTO agreement in Beijing in 1999 with United States Trade Representative Charlene Barshefsky. Sperling worked with then-Treasury Secretary Larry Summers to negotiate protections for the Community Reinvestment Act in the Financial Modernization Act of 1999, also known as the Gramm–Leach–Bliley Act. These protections helped secure passage of the bill. Sperling represented the U.S. government and gave a keynote address at the World Education Forum in Dakar, Senegal in 2000, where the world committed to the second millennium development goal of universal primary education.

=== Post-Clinton administration ===
After leaving the Clinton administration, Sperling focused on promoting universal education, particularly for girls in poor and developing nations. In 2002, he founded the Center for Universal Education at the Council on Foreign Relations and the Brookings Institution and served as its first executive director for seven years from 2002 to 2008. In that role, Sperling advocated for a global compact for education for all children, with publications on universal education for all nations in Foreign Affairs, The New York Times, Washington Post, Financial Times, Los Angeles Times, and IMF Quarterly: Finance and Development. He also authored concept papers for the Education for All Fast Track Initiative on Closing the Trust Gaps: Unlocking Financing for Education in Fragile State and How to Unlock Financing for Fragile States and Move Toward a More Unified Global Architecture for Education Financing: Eight Preliminary Recommendations. Sperling was a member of U.N. Millennium Task Force on Girls' Education.

In 2003, Sperling also founded the Global Campaign for Education-US, a broad-based coalition of national and community-based organizations, international NGOs, teacher unions, faith-based groups, and think tanks dedicated to ensuring universal quality education for all children. The organization's mission is "to promote education as a basic human right and mobilize to create political will in the United States and internationally to ensure universal quality education."

In 2004, he co-authored the book What Works in Girls' Education: Evidence and Policies from the Developing World with Barbara Herz. In addition, Sperling was also a senior fellow at the Center for American Progress, and authored The Pro-Growth Progressive: An Economic Strategy for Shared Prosperity in that role. For four years, he was a consultant and had partial writing credit for four episodes for the television series The West Wing. Sperling is the author of the 2020 book Economic Dignity, building on a 2019 piece he published in Democracy Journal.

Sperling was a top economic adviser for Hillary Clinton during her 2008 presidential campaign.

Prior to joining the Obama administration, Sperling earned $887,727 from Goldman Sachs in 2008 for his work helping to create and implement their 10,000 Women charitable initiative, which funds business education for women in developing nations. He was also compensated $158,000 for speeches, mostly to financial companies. Sperling received $2.2 million in total compensation in 2008 from a variety of consulting jobs, board seats, speaking fees and fellowships.

=== Obama administration ===
From 2009 to 2011, Sperling served as a counselor to Treasury Secretary Timothy Geithner. He advised on responding to the financial crisis, was a member of the Obama Auto Rescue Task Force, was Geithner's top aide on fiscal, budget, tax, and small business issues, and coordinated the Treasury efforts on design and passage of the Affordable Care Act. Sperling was a leading advocate in the administration for increasing refundable tax credits for working families, extending unemployment benefits, adding restrictions on executive compensation for companies receiving public funds, and proposing a fee on major financial institutions. Sperling was reported to have been one of the key members of the administration to advocate to President Barack Obama that he save Chrysler. Sperling is credited with designing the Small Business Jobs Act of 2010, which created a $30 billion fund for loans and the State Small Business Credit Initiative.

In January 2011, Obama appointed Sperling as the director of the National Economic Council, Sperling's second tenure in that position. In that role, Sperling played a key role representing the White House in budget negotiations with Congress as well as serving as the White House point person on several of the president's top priorities including job creation, manufacturing policy, housing, GSE reform, and skills initiatives. He was credited with being the key architect of the $447 billion American Jobs Act and he led the Obama administration's Detroit rescue task force in 2013, which mobilized $300 million to support Detroit. Sperling also led the design and implementation of the president's initiatives on supporting workers facing long-term unemployment, Manufacturing Innovation Hubs, SelectUSA, the College Opportunity Summit, and the ConnectED initiative. According to Robert Greenstein, president of the Center on Budget and Policy Priorities, "If you look at key budget legislation – in 1993, 1997, 2009, 2010 or 2012 – there is no administration official who did more over the past 20 years to dramatically expand tax credits for low-income workers, with the result that these credits now lift 10 million people out of poverty."

Sperling was named one of the 100 Most Powerful People in Finance worldwide in 2013 by Worth Magazine. He was named one of the 50 Most Powerful People in Washington by GQ in 2012.

Sperling left the National Economic Council in March 2014.

Two years after Sperling left the White House, a ProPublica article reported that he had taken loans totaling between $300,000 and $600,000 from Howard Shapiro, a lawyer at Wilmer Cutler Pickering Hale and Dorr, between 2011 and 2013. Shapiro has been Sperling's closest friend since they were housemates at Yale Law School in 1983. Sperling stated that when his savings were depleted, he "took personal loans from my very closest friend of more than 30 years so that I could afford to remain in public service without having to sell our house when we had only two more years left with both of our children at home." His house in Washington, D.C. was valued at "around $2 million."

A White House spokesperson said that every loan had been "reviewed and cleared by White House Counsel and the Office of Government Ethics" and that "no issue came before Sperling that prompted him to recuse himself." Kenneth Gross, a partner at Skadden, Arps, Slate, Meagher & Flom who specializes in federal gift and gratuity rules, stated that the fact that the loans were disclosed and cleared by the ethics office "takes the guy off the hook. What more is he supposed to do?"

The ProPublica article stated that Sperling "played a role" in a federal and state government settlement with five major financial institutions over foreclosure and mortgage servicing abuses, and that WilmerHale was "one of many law firms involved in negotiating the settlement," though it did not state that Shapiro was involved in the settlement. Sperling told ProPublica he was not involved in the negotiations and only "helped decide that settlement money would go toward reducing principal on mortgages for borrowers whose homes were worth less than their mortgages." The Financial Times reported that Sperling met with groups such as the National Association for the Advancement of Colored People (NAACP) to persuade them of the benefits the deal would have for borrowers.

=== Biden administration ===
On March 15, 2021, President Joe Biden announced that Sperling was selected to oversee the roll-out of the newly signed $1.9 trillion American Rescue Plan Act of 2021. He resigned in August 2024 in order to assume a position as a senior economic advisor on the Kamala Harris 2024 presidential campaign.

== Personal life ==
Sperling is married to television writer Allison Abner, whom he met when he was a consultant on NBC's The West Wing. They have a daughter, Nina, and a son, Miles.

== Works ==
- Dellinger, Walter; Sperling, Gene B. (1989). "Abortion and the Supreme Court: The Retreat from Roe v. Wade". University of Pennsylvania Law Review. 138 (1): 83–118. doi:10.2307/3312180. JSTOR 3312180.
- Herz, Barbara; Sperling, Gene B. (2004). What Works In Girls' Education: Evidence And Policies From The Developing World. New York: Council on Foreign Relations Press. ISBN 978-0-87609-344-3.
- Sperling, Gene B. (1985). "Judicial Right Declaration and Entrenched Discrimination". Yale Law Journal. 94 (7): 1741–1765. doi:10.2307/796220. JSTOR 796220.
- ——— (2001). "Toward Universal Education: Making a Promise, and Keeping It". Foreign Affairs. 80 (5): 7–13. doi:10.2307/20050246. JSTOR 20050246.
- ——— (2005). The Pro-Growth Progressive: An Economic Strategy for Shared Prosperity. New York: Simon & Schuster. ISBN 978-0-7432-3753-6.
- Sperling, Gene (2020). Economic Dignity. Penguin Press. ISBN 978-1984879875.
- Treanor, William Michael; Sperling, Gene B. (1993). "Prospective Overruling and the Revival of 'Unconstitutional' Statutes". Columbia Law Review. 93 (8): 1902–1955. doi:10.2307/1123007. JSTOR 1123007.

Political offices
Preceded by Laura Tyson; Larry Summers	Director of the National Economic Council; 1996–2001; 2011–2014	Succeeded by Lawrence B. Lindsey; Jeff Zients
