= Democracy Prep Public Schools =

Charter school management company

Democracy Prep Public Schools, also known as Democracy Prep, is a charter school management company which manages a network of 25 Charter Schools in New York City, New Jersey, Nevada and Texas. Over 7,000 students are enrolled in its schools.

== History ==
Democracy Prep Public Schools was founded in 2005 and opened its first school in 2006 as Democracy Preparatory Charter School. Democracy Prep schools primarily serve students of color who live in poverty. In 2019, Natasha Trivers was appointed Democracy Prep's CEO. In 2021, Democracy Prep announced a major expansion in the Bronx. Teachers at Democracy Prep attend trainings throughout the school year.

The charter operator is one of five designated in Florida's Schools of Hope program. A school it operates in Nevada has been sued on First Amendment grounds over a civic class curriculum it requires.

=== Seth Andrew Theft Case ===
Democracy Prep was founded by Seth Andrew. Andrew stepped down as head of the school network in 2013 to work as an advisor to U.S. president Barack Obama's administration. In 2017, Andrew severed ties with the Democracy Prep organization. In 2022, he pled guilty to wire fraud, admitting to diverting money from the charter school organization's accounts in 2019 to other non-profits.
