= Global education =

Global education is a mental development program that seeks to improve global human development based on the understanding of global dynamics, through the various sectors of human development delivery. In formal education, as a mode of human development delivery, it is integrated into formal educational programs, as an advanced program where global dimensions to local problems are appreciated through interconnectivity. Its first phase began as an undertaking to restructure education and society in the 1960s and 1970s, through the initiatives of educationalists, NGOs and intergovernmental organizations. The program evolves with the internet, and is in its virtual interconnectivity phase, through social media and other global public spheres. This global approach to mental development, seeks to fix the failing curriculum-based global education program that is: stuck in limited subject knowledge, based on theories that have failed the world (ref. Climate change);hinged on memorization without visual exposure to knowledge development resources and global culture, limited by access to human development resources. Instead, the program seeks to improve the global mental resources pool through the appreciation of global dynamics and local perspectives on issues. This is through alternative motivations for global human development, and alternative global futures hinged on interconnectivity.

== Other definitions (national/regional) ==
Australia:

- It is perceived to enable young people to participate in shaping a better, shared future for the world. It emphasizes the unity and interdependence of human society, developing a sense of self and appreciation of cultural diversity, affirmation of social justice and human rights, as well as building peace and actions for a sustainable future at different times and places. This approach is also believed to promote positive values and prods students to take responsibility for their actions and see themselves as global citizens who can contribute to a more peaceful, just and sustainable world.

United Kingdom:

- It is not a subject but a dimension that runs through the curriculum, an extra filter to help children make sense of all the information and opinions the world throws at them. It combines methodology - active and experiential discussion-based activities, a caring, co-operative and open outlook on the classroom experience, and core concerns- finding out about all the world's cultures and groups, about the causes of poverty and inequality and about the environment.
- It is a way of approaching everything being taught and how it is taught. It broadens horizons and encourages exploration of all subjects from a global perspective.

Network of Young Europeans:

- A creative approach to bring about change in society.
- An active learning process based on the universal values of tolerance, solidarity, equality, justice, inclusion, co-operation and non-violence.
- It begins with raising awareness of global challenges and creates a deeper understanding of the complex underlying issues thereby changing people's attitudes and encourages them to reflect on their own role in the world.

Tokyo Global Engineering Corporation:

- The application of currently accepted scientific principles to the design of projects that cannot be implemented until the emergence of a global state. An example is an updated version of the Cosmopolitan Railway, using a vactrain instead of rail.

== In the United States ==
The National Education Association (NEA) recognizes Global Education to be a goal that educators strive to succeed in the classroom. The American association supports study abroad trips and teaching overseas for teachers to get a first-hand experience of different cultures.

Universities in the United States are also expanding their study abroad programs to enhance greater interconnectedness and global economic interdependence. The Institute of International Education (IIE) is researching effective ways that higher education in the United States can grow and create quality study abroad programs within the curriculum.

Many K-12 schools within the United States have adapted a Global Education Framework that was created for statewide implementation. Within this framework consist of six essential steps for a successful global education curriculum within each school:

1. Global Competency Standards for Students and Teachers
2. Effective and Scalable Teacher Supports, Resources, and Tools for infusing classroom with global knowledge and skills
3. A New Approach to Language Instruction that includes statewide dual language/immersion plan beginning in elementary school
4. Whole-School Models that include internationally themes schools, transformation models for low-performing schools, and regional duel language/immersion schools
5. Networking and Recognizing Districts, Schools, and Educators to drive implementation and innovation
6. Global Experiences for Students and Educators including teacher exchange, educational travel, virtual exchange, and global academic competitions

== Worldwide global education programs ==
Universities in the United States have recently been expanding on the degree programs relating to global education. Many universities offer bachelor's degree programs and certifications in Global Education, M.S. degrees in Global and International Education, M.A. degrees in International Education, and doctorate degrees in International Education. Not only does the United States have programs for Global Education but so do other countries such as Canada, India, Mexico and European countries. For example, the Finnish Ministry of Education (Finland), in Europe directly put Global Education into their curriculum. They also made Global Education mandatory, meaning you need this in order to improve students critical thinking abilities, their ability to understand the global economy and its complex structure in terms of social and cultural differences.

== Careers ==
People with a degree in international education design, implement, manage, and evaluate multiple education programs within public and private primary and secondary schools, public and private higher education programs, national corporations, and cultural agencies. People in the job field can work at agencies across the world, within elite universities, and a variety of global education organizations.

== Children's literature ==
Evidence based practices have shown that literature can help children learn about global issues. By exploring diversity in text, connecting the literature to service learning and activism, promote critical thinking about themselves in the global community, and develop their global awareness with literacy elements. Literature introduced in the classroom can teach multiple skills that prepare for further learning within the global community.

== Technology ==
Technology is a key provider in learning about globalization and participating in the global community. Technology can be used in the classroom to communicate around the world, establish global relationships, learn more about global current events, and developing global research. The advancements of technology will have a positive impact of global education in primary schools and higher education schools.

== Service learning ==
Service learning or local volunteer service work are included in conceptualized global citizenship programs. This approach is criticized because global relations are dramatically split into rich and poor, or oppressor and oppressed, respectively. Experiences of oppression are more complex than experiences of oppressing. Global citizenship education includes connecting nearby and worldwide issues and points of view and may incorporate such themes as human rights, social equity, and citizenship instruction, economic improvement, and globalization. Service learning can carry the possibility to recreate social disparities and advance, instead of dissipate, stereotypes.

== Organizations dealing with global educations ==
- CONCORD Development Awareness Raising and Education Forum
- Consortium for Global Education
- Global Education Network Europe
- Early Development of Global Education
