= Global Education Network Europe =

European network of bodies in the field of global education

The Global Education Network Europe (GENE) is the European network of ministries, agencies and other national bodies responsible for support, funding and policy-making in the field of global education. Started in 2001 with 6 national structures, GENE has grown to include structures from 25 countries leading the provision of global education in Europe, with combined annual budgets in excess of 150 million Euro.

== Definition ==
Global education can be defined as:

... education that opens people’s eyes and minds to the realities of the world, and awakens them to bring about a world of greater justice, equity and human rights for all. GE is understood to encompass Development Education, Human Rights Education, Education for Sustainability, Education for Peace and Conflict Prevention and Intercultural Education; being the global dimensions of Education for Citizenship.

== Goals ==
The purpose of GENE is to support national structures in their work of improving the quality and increasing the provision of global education in Europe. GENE does this through networking and regular round table discussions, through peer learning and policy research, and through the development of national strategies.

Aims of GENE:

- To share experience and strategies among existing and emerging national structures, in order to inform best practice nationally and provide mutual support and learning.
- To disseminate learning from the participating countries to other countries in Europe, so that structures for Global Education subsequently emerging will learn from this experience, and so that, eventually, all countries in Europe might have national co-ordinating structures for the increase and improvement of global education.
- To develop and pursue a common European agenda on strengthening global education.

The goal of GENEs work is to improve the quality and provision of global education in Europe. The benchmark towards which GENE works is towards the day when all people in Europe will have access to quality global education. GENE achieves this through networking of national strategies, through peer learning, and through common projects, bilateral exchange and capacity building.

== Participating Ministries and Agencies ==
=== Austria ===
- ADA, Austrian Development Agency
- Federal Ministry of Education, Science and Research, Austria
- KommEnt

=== Belgium ===
- FPS Foreign Affairs, Foreign Trade and Development Cooperation
- Enabel – Belgian Development Agency

=== Bulgaria ===
- Ministry of Education and Science

=== Czech Republic ===
- Czech Development Agency

=== Estonia ===
- Ministry of Foreign Affairs
- Ministry for Education and Research
- Estonian National Commission for UNESCO

=== Finland ===
- Ministry of Foreign Affairs,
- EDUFI

=== France ===
- Ministry of Foreign Affairs and Development Cooperation
- AFD – French Development Agency

=== Germany ===
- Engagement Global

=== Greece ===
- Ministry of Foreign Affairs
- Ministry of National Education, Research and Religion

=== Hungary ===
- Ministry for Foreign Affairs and Trade

=== Ireland ===
- Irish Aid, Department of Foreign Affairs
- Department of Education and Skills

=== Latvia ===
- Ministry of Foreign Affairs
- Ministry of Education and Science

=== Lithuania ===
- Ministry of Foreign Affairs
- Lithuanian Children and Youth Centre

=== Luxembourg ===
- Ministry of Foreign and European Affairs

=== Malta ===
- Ministry for Education and Employment
- Ministry for Foreign Affairs and Trade Promotion
- Education Malta Foundation

=== Montenegro ===
- Ministry of Education

=== Norway ===
- RORG Network

=== Poland ===
- Ministry of Foreign Affairs
- Ministry of National Education

=== Portugal ===
- Instituto Camões
- Directorate-General for Education – Ministry of Education
- CIDAC

=== Slovak Republic ===
- Slovak Aid

=== Slovenia ===
- Ministry of Foreign Affairs
- Ministry of Education, Science and Sport

=== Serbia ===
- Ministry of Education, Science and Technological Development

=== Spain ===
- AECID
- Ministry of Education, Culture and Sports

=== Sweden ===
- Swedish Council for Higher Education

=== United Kingdom ===
- Dfid

== European global education peer review process ==
In 2002 the Maastricht Declaration identified the desirability of developing a system of peer review for global education in Europe. Following a 2003 feasibility study, the "European Global Education Peer Review Process" was established to increase and improve the provision of global education in Europe. GENE and the North-South Centre worked closely together to develop this process.

The European Global Education Peer Review Process has, since late 2005, been facilitated by GENE, through its secretariat. The funding for the process and the peer review expertise has been provided by GENE participants.

The key aim of the Europe-wide process is to increase and improve support for, access to, and the impact of global education in European countries. National reports, and the peer review processes leading to them, act as both a tool to enhance quality and impact nationally, and a mechanism for international comparative analysis, benchmarking and policy making.

== National reports ==
To date 13 peer reviews have taken place. Estonia (2019), Cyprus (2017), Belgium (2016), Ireland (2015), Portugal (2013–14), Slovakia (2013–14), Norway (2009–10), Poland (2009–10), the Czech Republic (2008), Austria (2006), the Netherlands (2005), Finland (late 2004), and Cyprus (pilot review, early 2004). The first Global Education National Report, on Cyprus, was published in early 2004 as a pilot review being part of the initial feasibility study.
