= Rocketship Education =

Coordinates: 37.5200564°N 122.2577127°W

Rocketship Public Schools
- California, Wisconsin, Tennessee, Texas, Washington D.C.

Information
- Former name: Rocketship Education
- Type: Charter schools
- Founded: 2006
- Founders: Preston Smith, John Danner
- Website: www.rocketshipschools.org

Rocketship Public Schools (RPS) is a non-profit charter school network headquartered in Redwood City, California.

== History ==
Rocketship was founded by Preston Smith and John Danner in 2006. The organization opened its first school in San Jose, California in 2007. At its flagship school, students scored as high as Palo Alto School District students on California's state assessment, earning praise as an innovative alternative for low-income students. As a result, Rocketship expanded quickly and opened six additional charter schools in the San Jose area over the next five years. As a result of a planned succession in January 2013, Danner left the company and Smith was named CEO. In August 2013, Rocketship opened its first school outside of California in Milwaukee, Wisconsin. In 2014, Rocketship expanded its network to Nashville, Tennessee. In 2016, Rocketship opened its fourth region in Washington, D.C., in 2016, where its K-5 schools also offer preschool through a partnership with Apple Tree Institute. In August 2022, Rocketship opened its first school in Texas offering Pre-K-3.

Several Rocketship facilities received funding from former tennis pro, Andre Agassi's Turner-Agassi Charter School Facilities Fund. Agassi helped to open the Rocketship Rise Academy in Washington D.C. Ward 8, its first school in the District of Columbia. He also dedicated the Rocketship United Academy in Nashville.

In February 2015, it was announced that Reed Hastings, the CEO of Netflix, was donating $2 million to Rocketship to support its Bay Area growth. The Obama administration invested $2 million in Rocketship's growth. In September 2017, the Education Department awarded a grant to Rocketship as part of $250 million dedicated to charter management organizations for building new schools.

In 2017, Rocketship Education changed its name to Rocketship Public Schools.

=== California ===
In 2007, Rocketship opened its first school in San Jose, the Mateo Sheedy Elementary School. By 2011, Rocketship had 5 elementary schools, including Mosaic Elementary and Discovery Prep which opened that Fall. In July 2013, Rocketship got permission to build its eighth school in San Jose near the Tamien light-rail station.

In 2015, over 400 parents organized a successful campaign to bring Rocketship to Redwood City, California.

In December 2016, Antioch Unified schools gained initial approval Rocketship to open its third charter school in the district. In November 2017, Rocketship got formal approval to open a third charter elementary school worth $14.4 million in Antioch, California on a property it previously purchased on Cavallo Road. The school received a charter from the Antioch Unified School District. At the time, Rocketship operated 18 schools in three states, as well as Washington D.C.

It was announced in March 2017 that the Rocketship Futuro Academy in Concord, California would move from its location in portables of the Ayers Elementary site to the former site of Glenbrook Middle School, which closed in 2011. The school would share the space with Seneca Center, a mental health services nonprofit for district students. That same month, Rocketship Alma Academy was renewed by the Santa Clara County Board of Education for a five-year charter.

In July 2017, Rocketship got permission to move its Redwood City Prep location in Redwood City, California from its temporary location on Connecticut Drive to a larger facility on Charter Street.

=== Milwaukee ===
In 2013, the company opened Southside Community Prep, its first school in Milwaukee, the first location outside of California. Rocketship purchased the old Carleton Elementary School building for a second Milwaukee location in 2016.

=== Nashville ===
In 2014, the Rocketship Nashville Northeast Elementary opened in Nashville. The company opened a second Nashville location, the Rocketship United Academy, in 2015.

=== Washington D.C. ===
In 2011, Rocketship made a deal with D.C. Schools Chancellor Kaya Henderson to build 8 Rocketship schools in Washington D.C. Its first school in Ward 8 got its conditional approval in 2013, and in April 2015, Rocketship broke ground on the new school. The school, Rise Academy, opened in August 2016. Its second D.C. location, Legacy Prep, opened in 2017.

=== Texas ===
In August 2022, Rocketship opened an elementary school in Fort Worth, Texas. The school, coined Dennis Dunkins Elementary, teaches Pre-K to 3rd Grade, but hopes to expand into 5th Grade.

== Academics ==
Rocketship uses a "hybrid" model of learning using individualized online learning as well as classroom teaching and small-group tutoring. Rocketship has worked with Teach For America, a nonprofit organization that puts college graduates in teaching jobs. Rocketship focuses on educating students from low-income families in order to eliminate the achievement gap. Reports for the 2016–17 school year showed 86 percent of students enrolled in Rocketship schools were from families with a low socioeconomic background, and 70 percent were students learning English as a second language.

Techbridge and eBay's Women in Technology program partnered with Rocketship in 2016 to organize a program allowing a group of fifth-grade students in San Jose to visit eBay's global headquarters.

In 2017, Rocketship launched QueenHype, an empowerment program for girls focused on communication, initially launched at Discovery Prep. That same year, Rocketship partnered with Web of Life Field (WOLF) School to add school science trips for fifth-grade students during the 2016–17 school year.

== Schools ==
The Bay Area

- Delta Prep
- Futuro Academy
- Redwood City Prep
- Spark Academy
- Sí Se Puede Academy
- Rising Stars Academy
- Mosaic Elementary
- Mateo Sheedy Elementary
- Los Sueños Academy
- Fuerza Community Prep
- Discovery Prep
- Brilliant Minds
- Alma Academy

Nashville

- Partners Community Prep
- United Academy
- Nashville Northeast Elementary

Milwaukee

- Northside School (August 2018)
- Southside Community Prep

Washington D.C.

- Ward 5 School
- Legacy Prep
- Rise Academy

Texas

- Dennis Dunkins Elementary
