= Kenya National Union of Teachers =

Kenyan trade union

KNUT
- Kenya National Union of Teachers
- Founded: 1957
- Headquarters: Nairobi, Kenya
- Location: Kenya
- Key people: Collins Oyuu
- Affiliations: COTU
- Website: https://www.knut.or.ke/

The Kenya National Union of Teachers (KNUT) is the largest teachers' trade union in Kenya. It was formed on December 4, 1957. Its first secretary-general was Joseph Kioni. The union held its first strike in 1963, soon before Kenyan independence. Other major strikes have been held in 1966, 1969, 1997, 1998, 2002 and 2009.

== List of secretaries-general ==
Secretary-general is the highest post in the Kenya National Union of Teachers. Those who have held the post are:

- Joseph Kioni (1958-1969)
- Ambrose Adeya Adongo (1970-2001)
- Francis Ng'ang'a (2001-2008)
- Lawrence Majali (2008–2010)
- David Okuta Osiany (2010-2013)
- Wilson Sossion (2013–2021)
- Collins Oyuu (2021-Present)
