= Independent Schools Association of Southern Africa =

The Independent Schools Association of Southern Africa (ISASA) is the largest and oldest association of independent schools in Southern Africa.

ISASA traces its origins back to the Conference of Headmasters and Headmistresses formed in 1929, and more recently to the Independent Schools Council, which was dissolved to create ISASA in 1999.

ISASA today is a not for profit company (NPC), which represents more than 900 independent schools in South Africa, Botswana, Eswatini, Namibia, Angola, Mozambique, Lesotho, Mauritius and Zambia. Over 210,000 learners attend ISASA-affiliated schools.

Since the collapse of the apartheid state and the advent of democracy in South Africa, dramatic changes have occurred in the independent (private) school sector. In 1990, there were approximately 550 registered independent schools in the country. The dominant public perception of independent schools at that time was “white, affluent and exclusive”.

In 2022 there are at least 2282 independent schools in South Africa. The sector educates more than 735,000 learners, of which roughly 75% are black (60% are Black African). Traditional, high-fee independent schools are now a minority in the sector, with only an estimated 20% of schools charging fees of more than R80 000 per annum.

Despite an increase in the number of for-profit independent schools, and in particular for-profit "chain schools", the sector remains largely not-for-profit. Most independent schools are also small schools, with 350 learners per school or less. The sector serves a wide range of different religions, philosophies and educational approaches across the full socio-economic spectrum.

Lebogang Montjane is the current Executive Director of ISASA. Other key personnel include Wayne Stuurman (Director: Membership and Programmes), Tshepo Motsepe (Director: Policy and Government Relations) and Laura Scarff (Director: Finance and Operations).
