= Izumo Sakane Station =

Railway station in Okuizumo, Shimane Prefecture, Japan

Izumo Sakane Station 出雲坂根駅
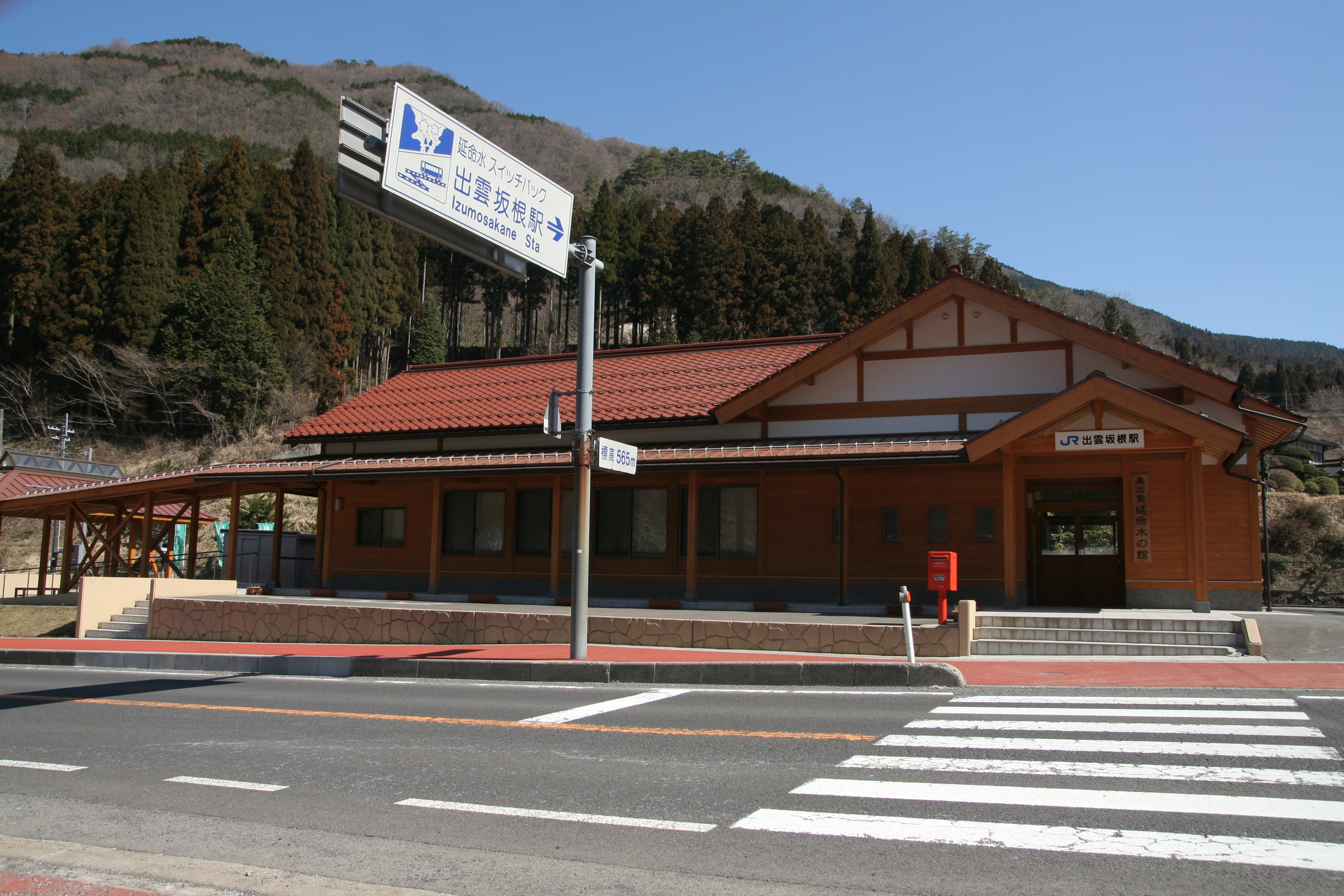
- Izumo Sakane Station, April 2011

General information
- Location: 992, Yakawa, Okuizumo-cho, Nita-gun, Shimane-ken 699-1811; Japan
- Coordinates: 35°6′8.34″N 133°7′14.61″E
- Operator: JR West
- Line: E Kisuki Line
- Distance: 63.6 km (39.5 miles) from Shinji
- Platforms: 2 side platforms
- Tracks: 2

Other information
- Status: Unstaffed
- Website: Official website

History
- Opened: 12 December 19374

Passengers
- 2020: 1 daily

Services
Preceding station	JR West	Following station
Yakawa towards Shinji	Kisuki Line	Miinohara towards Bingo Ochiai
Location
- Location within Shimane Prefecture Location within Japan

Izumo Sakane Station (出雲坂根駅, Izumo Sakane-eki) is a passenger railway station located in the town of Okuizumo, Nita District, Shimane Prefecture, Japan. It is operated by the West Japan Railway Company (JR West).

== Lines ==
Izumo Sakane Station is served by the Kisuki Line, and is located 63.6 kilometers from the terminus of the line at Shinji.

== Station layout ==
The station consists of two ground-level side platforms connected by a level crossing. A new station building was completed in April 2010. The station is unattended.

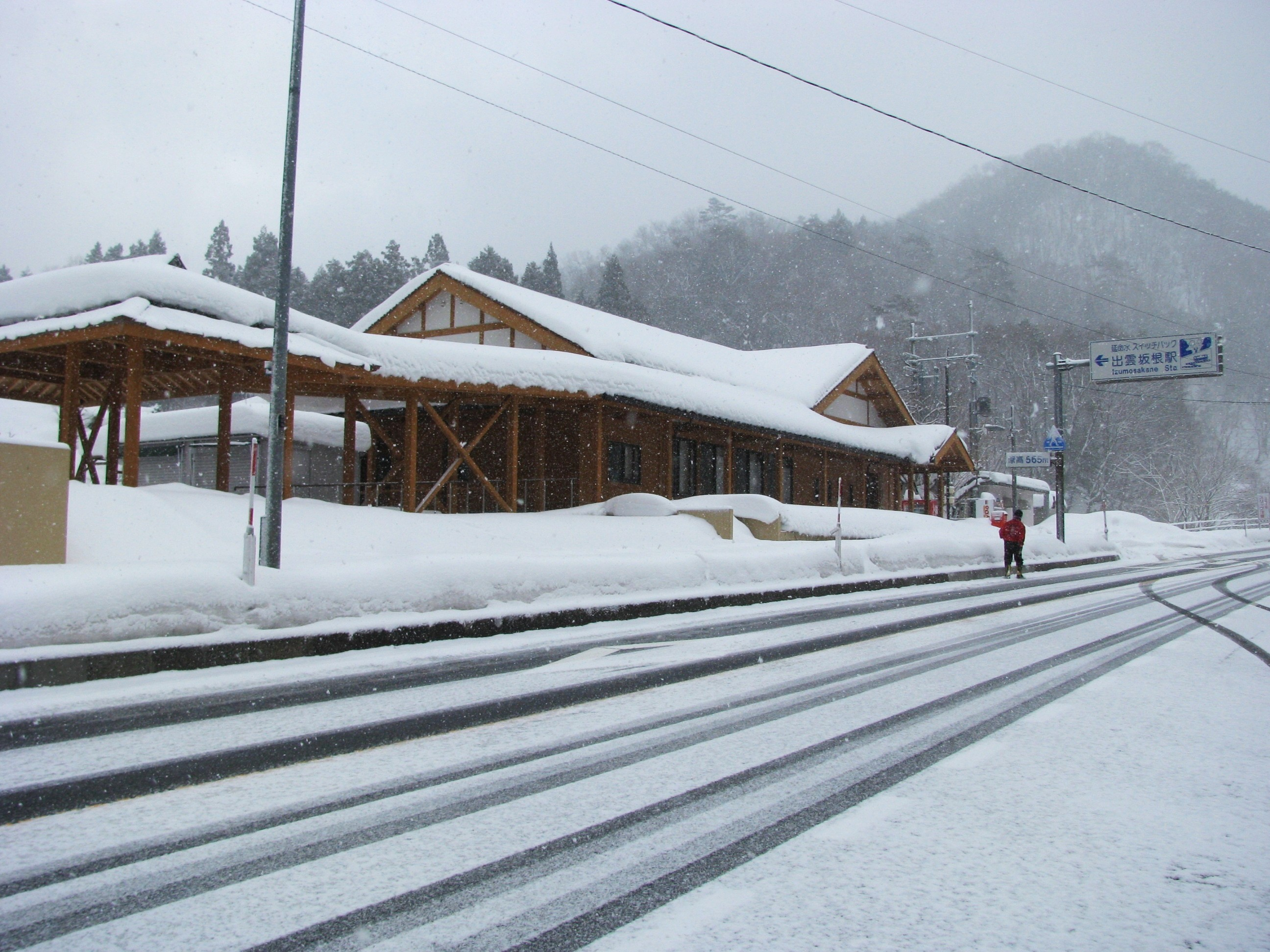
Izumo Sakane Station, January 2014

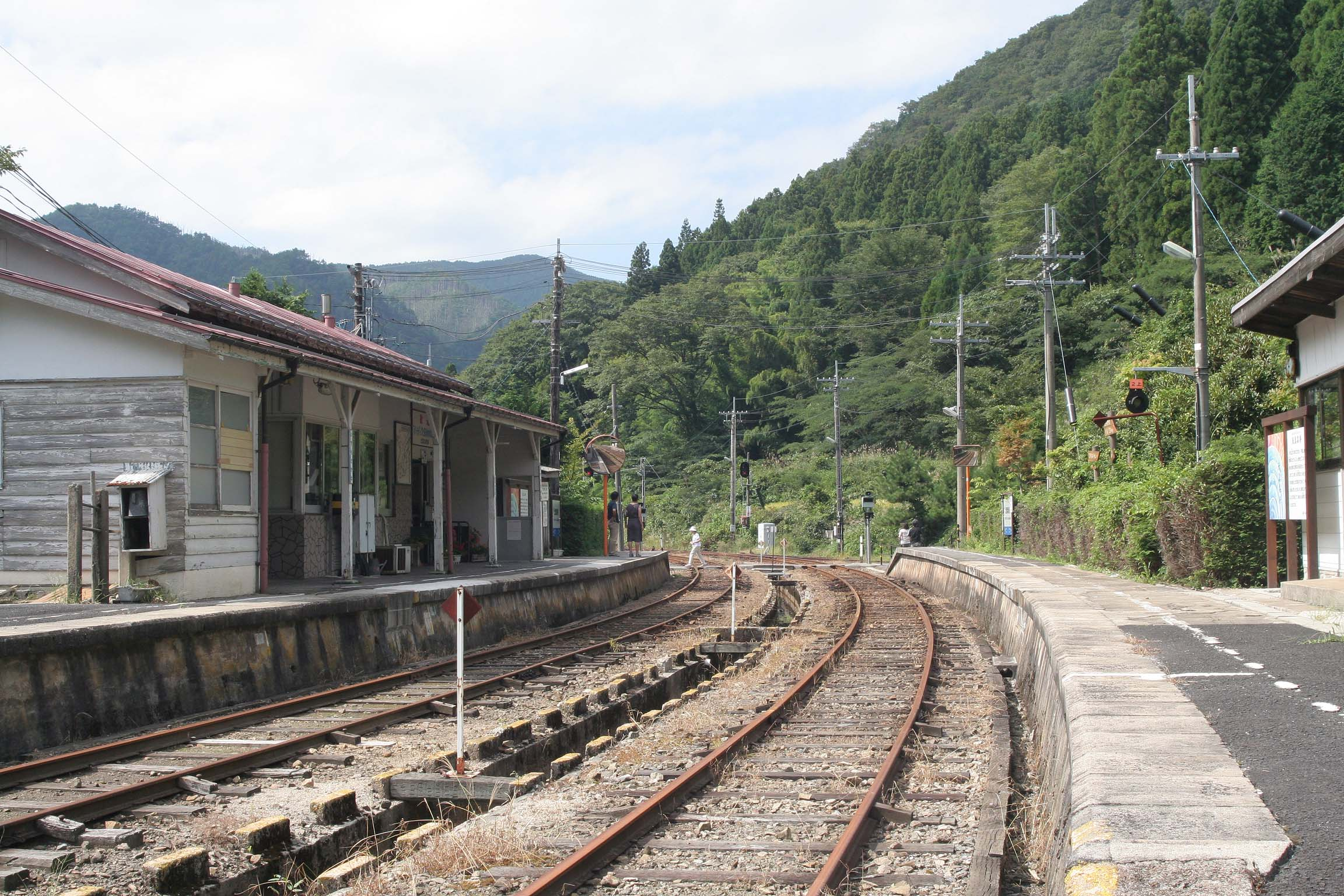
Platform

== History ==
Izumo Sakane Station was opened on 12 December 1937 when the extension between Yakawa Station and Bingo Ochiai Station on the Kisuki Line was completed. It became part of JR West on 1 April 1987 when Japan National Railways was privatized.

== Passenger statistics ==
In fiscal 2019, the station was used by an average of 1 passengers daily.

== Surrounding area ==
- Japan National Route 314

== See also ==
- List of railway stations in Japan
