= Yakawa Station =

Railway station in Okuizumo, Shimane Prefecture, Japan

Yakawa Station 八川駅
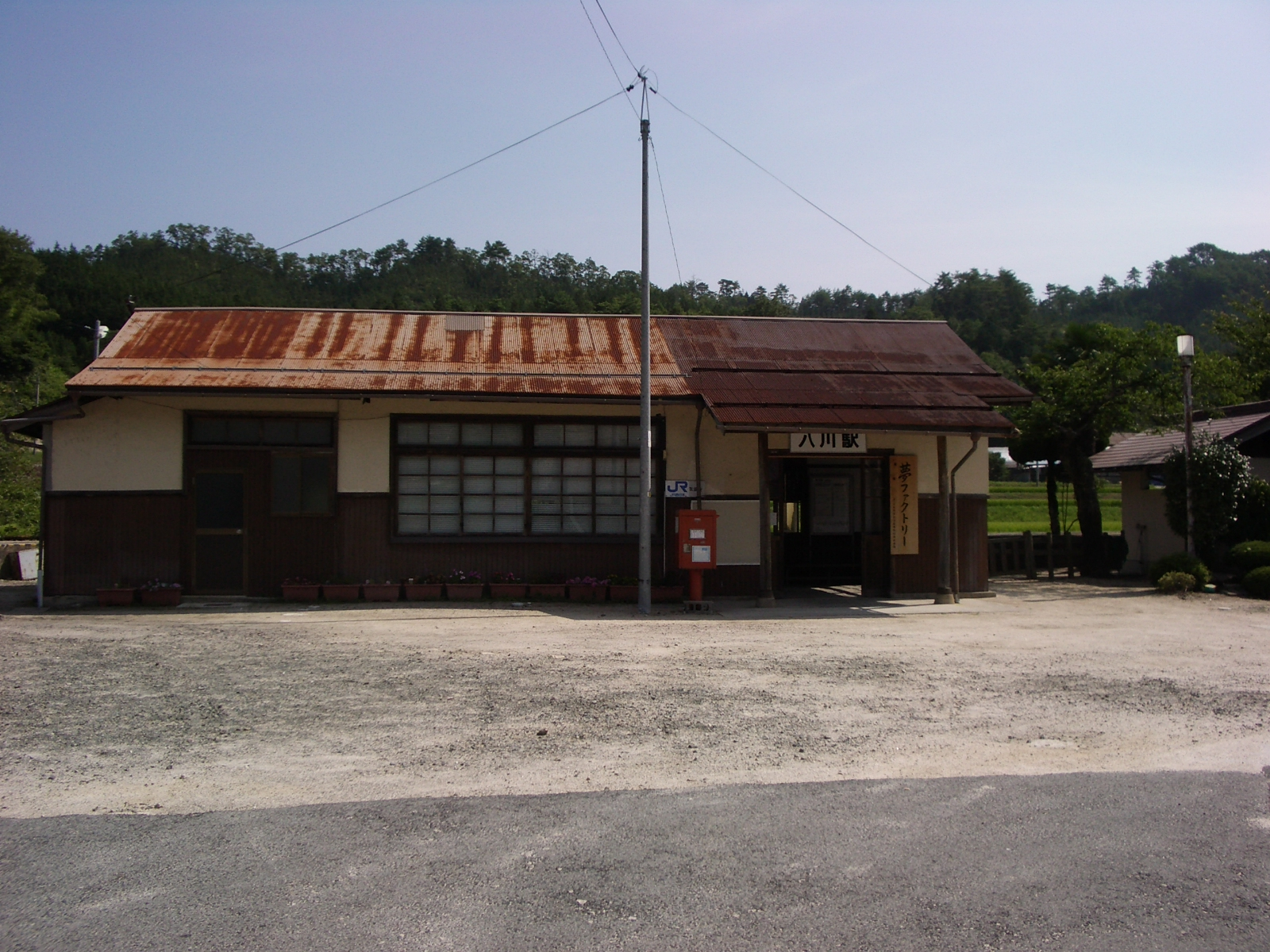
- Yakawa Station, August 2005

General information
- Location: 99, Yakawa, Okuizumo-cho, Nita-gun, Shimane-ken 699-1811; Japan
- Coordinates: 35°8′57.34″N 133°5′22.14″E
- Operator: JR West
- Line: E Kisuki Line
- Distance: 56.3 km (35.0 miles) from Shinji
- Platforms: 1 side platform
- Tracks: 1

Other information
- Status: Unstaffed
- Website: Official website

History
- Opened: 20 November 1934

Passengers
- 2020: 0 daily

Services
Preceding station	JR West	Following station
Izumo Yokota towards Shinji	Kisuki Line	Izumo Sakane towards Bingo Ochiai
Location
- Location within Shimane Prefecture Location within Japan

Yakawa Station (八川駅, Yakawa-eki) is a passenger railway station located in the town of Okuizumo, Nita District, Shimane Prefecture, Japan. It is operated by the West Japan Railway Company (JR West).

== Lines ==
Yakawa Station is served by the Kisuki Line, and is located 56.3 kilometers from the terminus of the line at Shinji.

== Station layout ==
The station consists of one ground-level side platform serving a single bi-directional track. It used to have two opposed side platforms and two tracks, but the one track and Platform number 2 have been removed. The wooden station building remains, and is staffed.

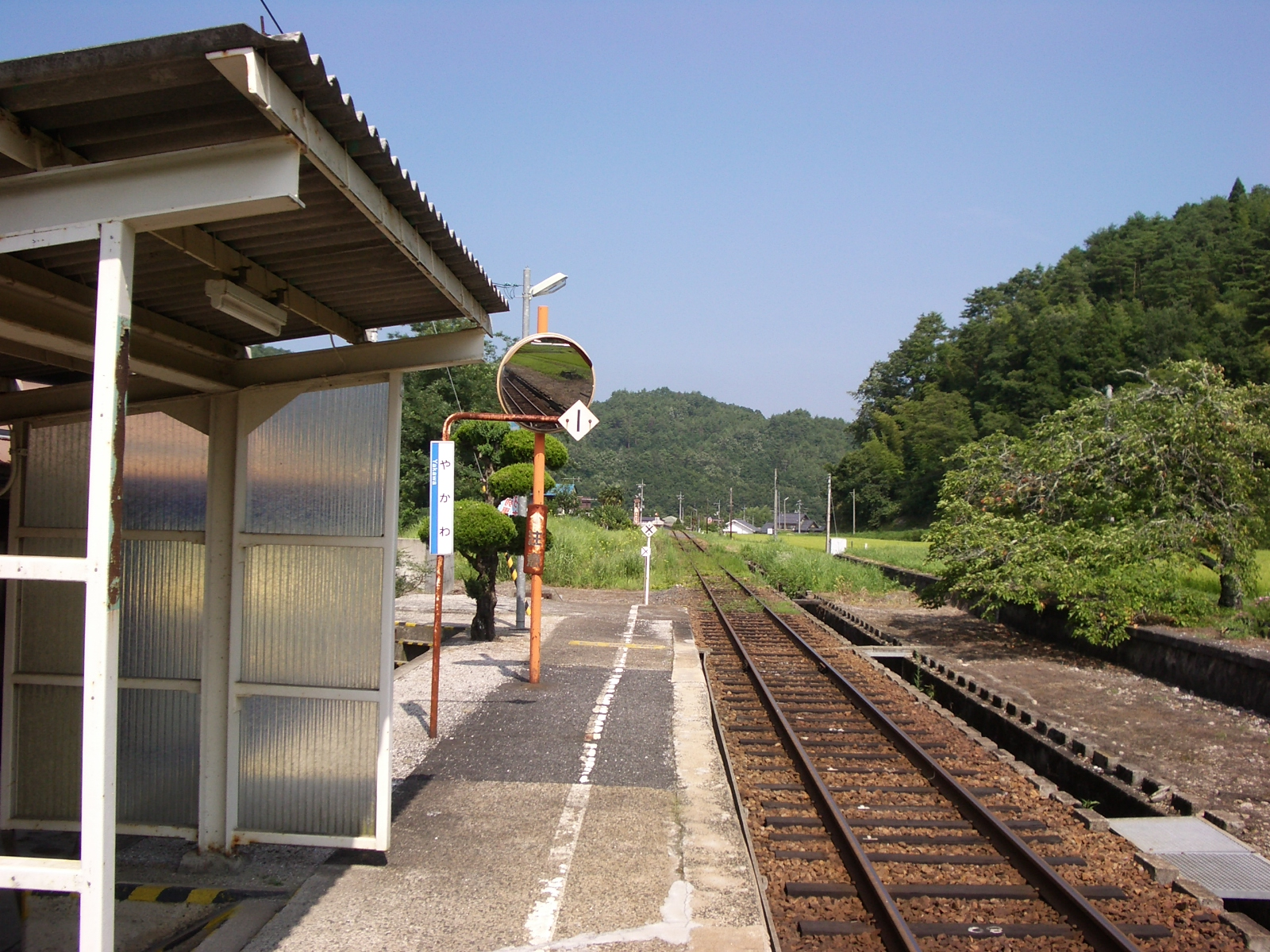
Platform, August 2005

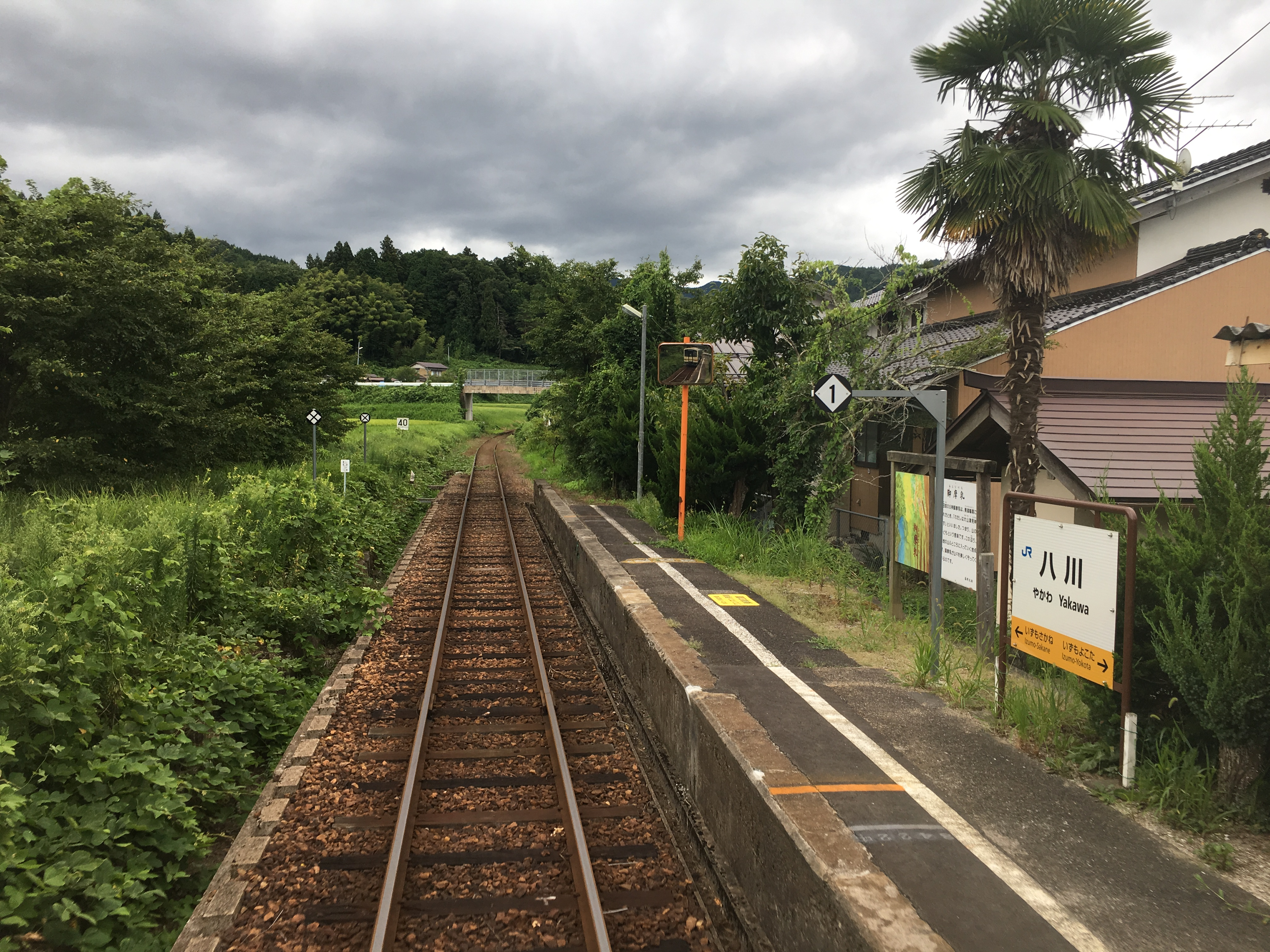
Platform, August 2019

== History ==
Yakawa Station was opened on 20 November 1934 when the extension from Izumo Minari Station on the Kisuki Line was completed. The line was further extended to Bingo-Ochiai on 12 December 1937. It became part of JR West on 1 April 1987 when Japan National Railways was privatized.

== Passenger statistics ==
In fiscal 2019, the station was used by an average of 0 passengers daily.

== Surrounding area ==
- Japan National Route 314

== See also ==
- List of railway stations in Japan
