= Miinohara Station =

Railway station in Okuizumo, Shimane Prefecture, Japan

Miinohara Station 三井野原駅
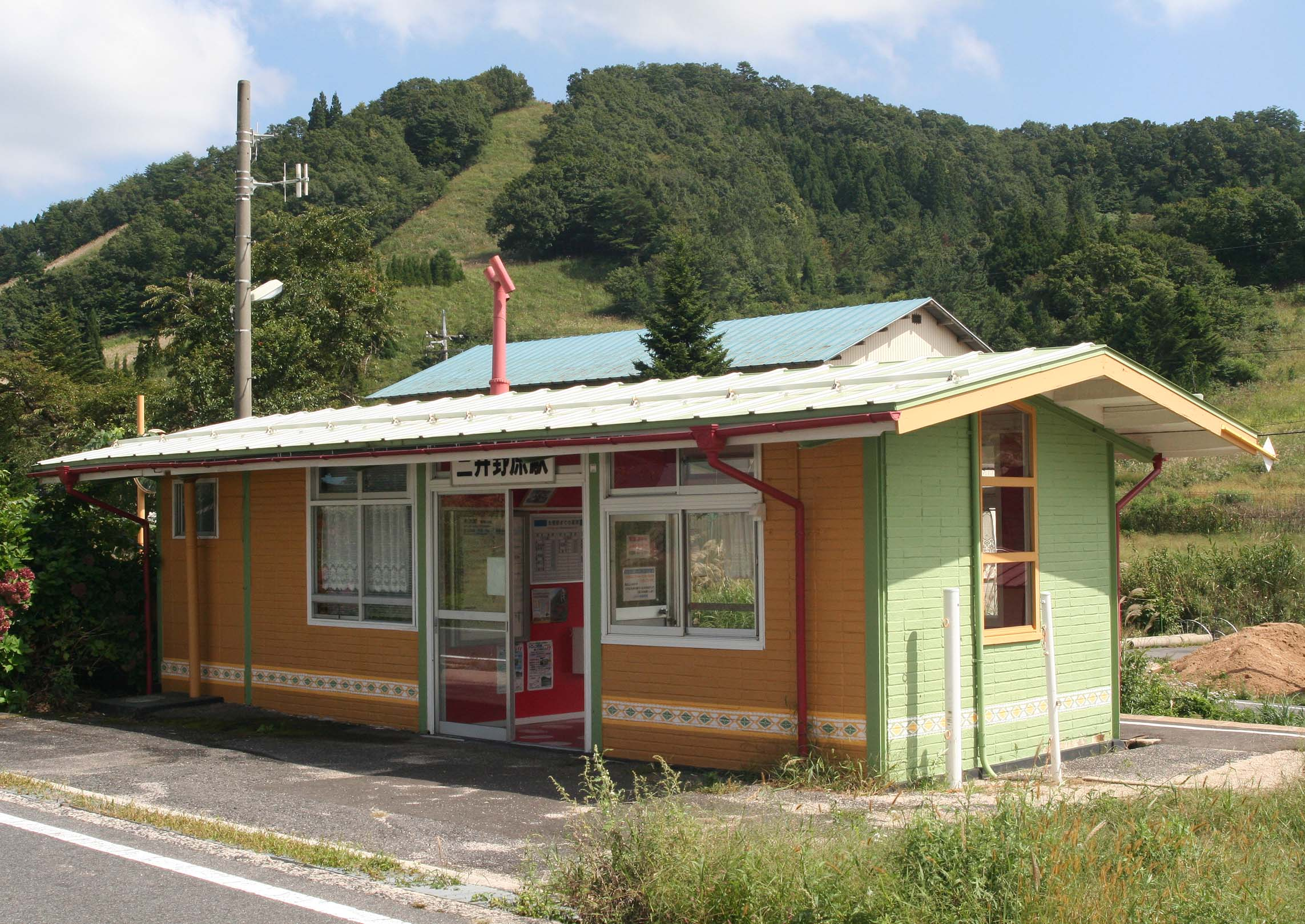
- Miinohara Station, September 2007

General information
- Location: 3109, Yakawa, Okuizumo-cho, Nita-gun, Shimane-ken 699-1811; Japan
- Coordinates: 35°5′28.65″N 133°6′58.74″E
- Operator: JR West
- Line: E Kisuki Line
- Distance: 69.7 km (43.3 miles) from Shinji
- Platforms: 1 side platform
- Tracks: 1

Other information
- Status: Unstaffed
- Website: Official website

History
- Opened: 24 December 1949

Passengers
- 2020: 1 daily

Services
Preceding station	JR West	Following station
Izumo Sakane towards Shinji	Kisuki Line	Yuki towards Bingo Ochiai
Location
- Location within Shimane Prefecture Location within Japan

Miinohara Station (三井野原駅, Miinohara-eki) is a passenger railway station located in the town of Okuizumo, Nita District, Shimane Prefecture, Japan. It is operated by the West Japan Railway Company (JR West).

== Lines ==
Miinohara Station is served by the Kisuki Line, and is located 69.7 kilometers from the terminus of the line at Shinji.

== Station layout ==
The station consists of one ground-level side platform serving a single bi-directional track. The station is unattended.

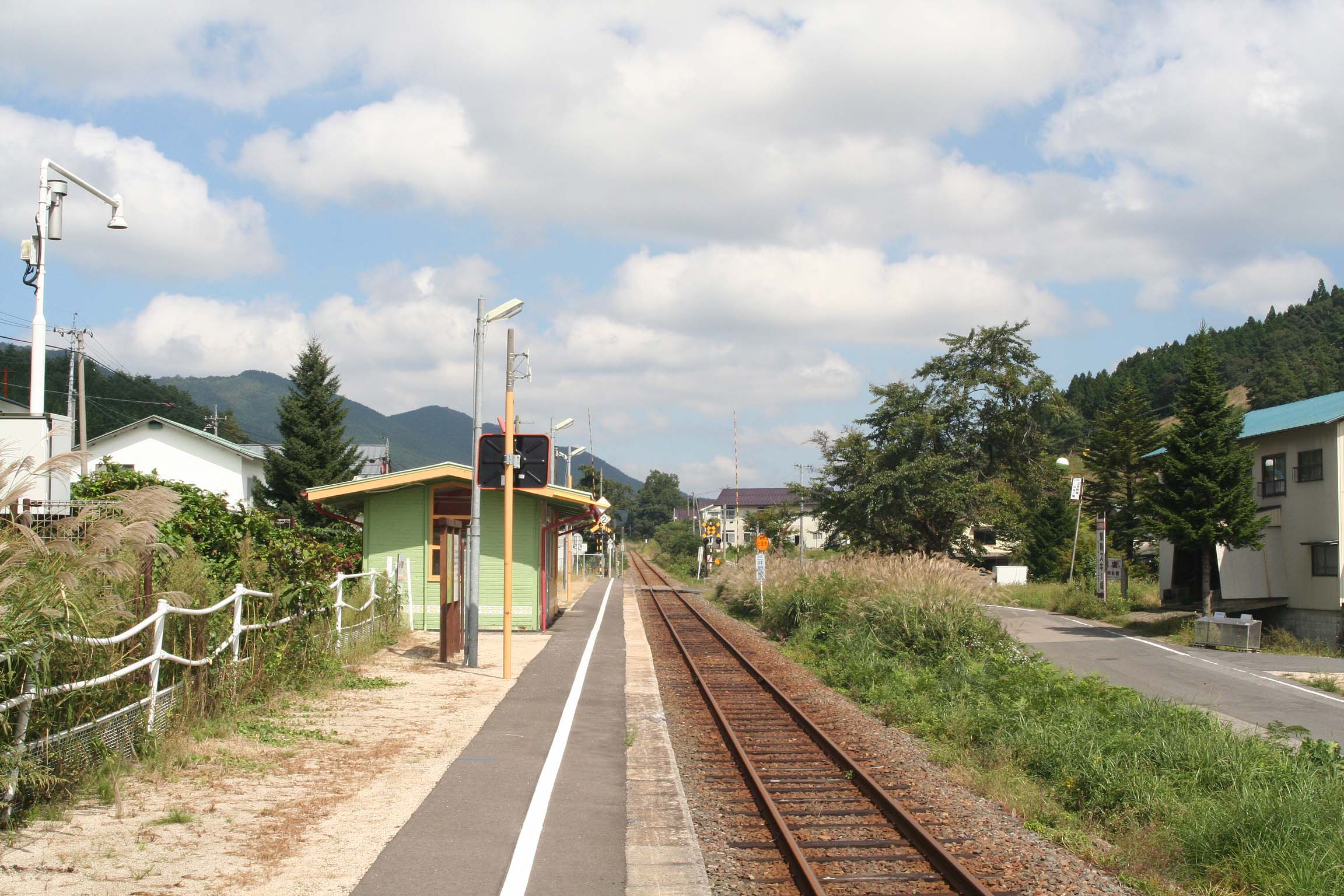
Tracks

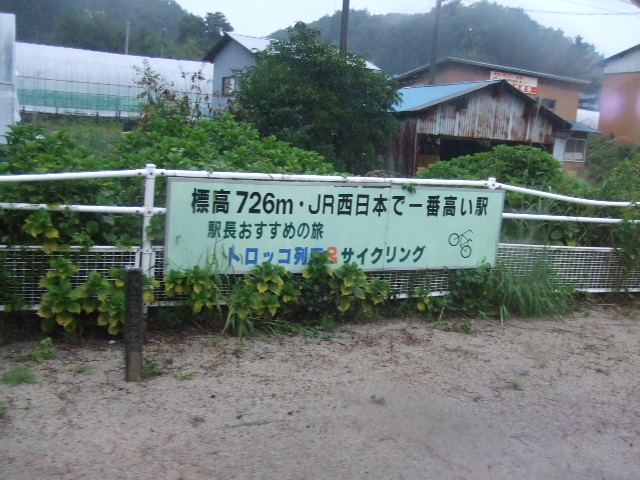
Sign proclaiming Miinohara Station to have the highest elevation of any JR West station

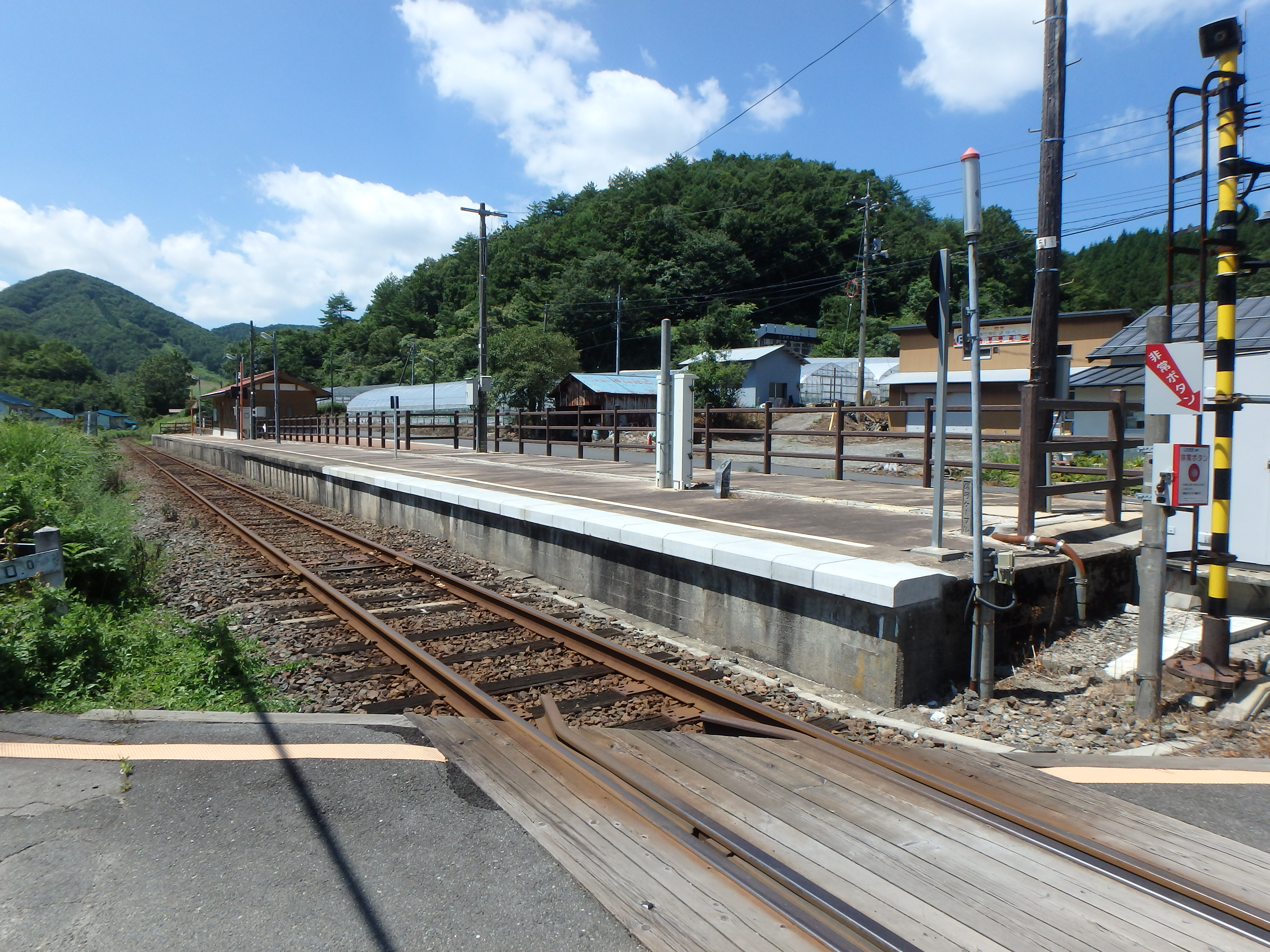
Crossing in front of station

== History ==
When the Kisuki Line was fully opened the distance from Izumo Sakane Station to Yuki Station is 12 kilometers, and the residents of Miinohara who live between had to go a long distance, even though the railway runs through the center of the area. Since the area is one of the heaviest snowfall areas in the San'in region and has mountains with gentle slopes, it was decided to justify the construction of a station by opening the Mitsinohara Ski Resort. As a result, construction of the ski resort and Mitsinohara temporary stop proceeded at the same time. When the station opened on 24 December 1949, it was a seasonal station with all local trains stopping only during skiing season. It was promoted to full passenger station on 1 September 1953, with the construction of the station building borne by the local community. It became part of JR West on 1 April 1987 when Japan National Railways was privatized.

== Passenger statistics ==
In fiscal 2019, the station was used by an average of 1 passenger daily.

== Surrounding area ==
- Mitsinohara Ski Resort
- Japan National Route 314

== See also ==
- List of railway stations in Japan
