= Izumo Yashiro Station =

Railway station in Okuizumo, Shimane Prefecture, Japan

Izumo Yashiro Station 出雲八代駅
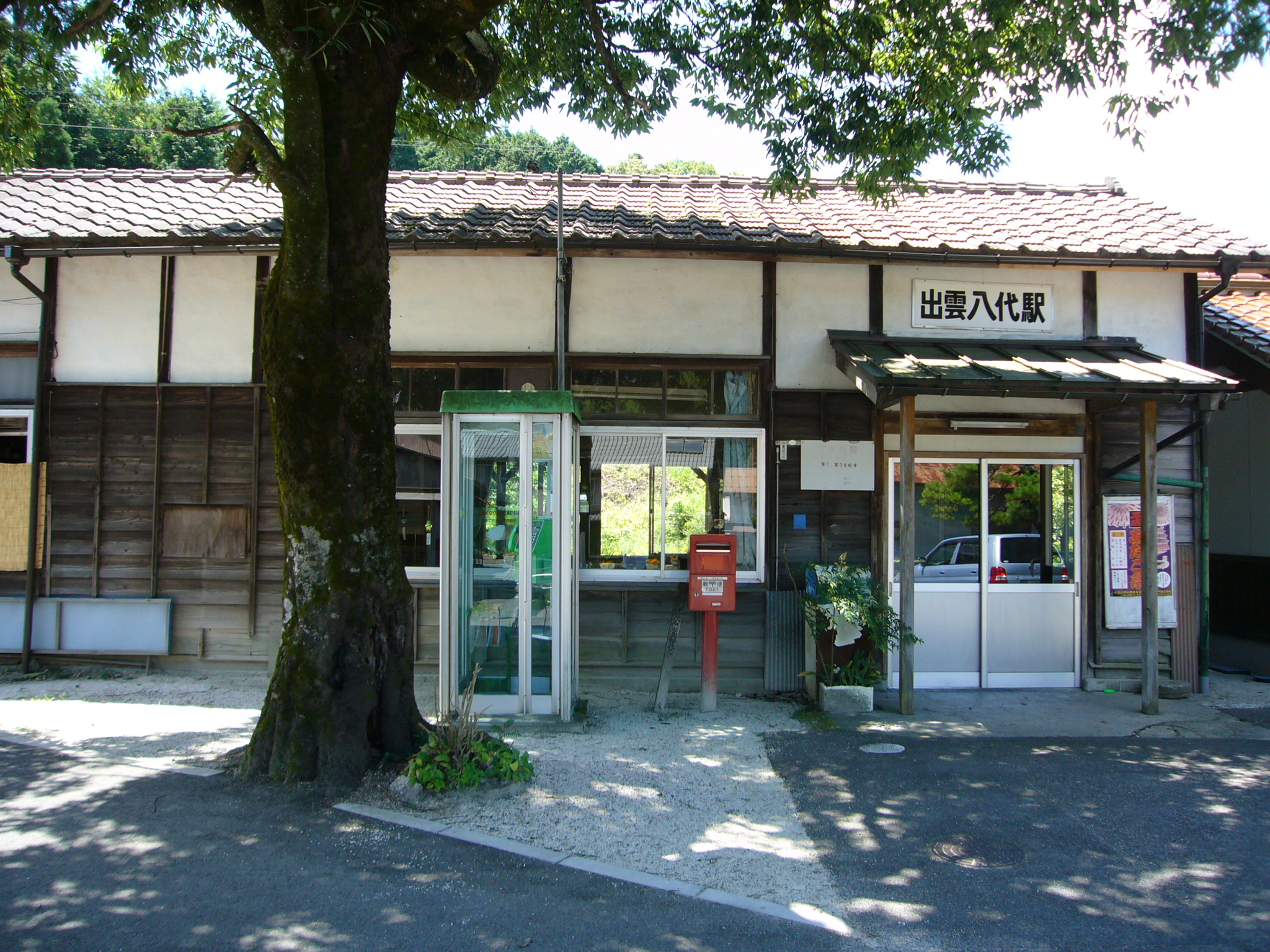
- Izumo Yashiro Station, August 2008

General information
- Location: 57 Mabase, Okuizumo-cho, Nita-gun, Shimane-ken 699-1432; Japan
- Coordinates: 35°13′38.22″N 133°0′5.1″E
- Operator: JR West
- Line: E Kisuki Line
- Distance: 37.4 km (23.2 miles) from Shinji
- Platforms: 1 side platform
- Tracks: 1

Other information
- Status: Unstaffed
- Website: Official website

History
- Opened: 18 December 1932

Passengers
- 2020: 12 daily

Services
Preceding station	JR West	Following station
Shimokuno towards Shinji	Kisuki Line	Izumo Minari towards Bingo Ochiai
Location
- Location within Shimane Prefecture Location within Japan

Izumo Yashiro Station (出雲八代駅, Izumo Yashiro-eki) is a passenger railway station located in the town of Okuizumo, Nita District, Shimane Prefecture, Japan. It is operated by the West Japan Railway Company (JR West).

== Lines ==
Izumo Yashiro Station is served by the Kisuki Line, and is located 37.4 kilometers from the terminus of the line at Shinji.

== Station layout ==
The station consists of one ground-level side platform serving a single bi-directional track. It used to have two opposed side platforms and two tracks, but one track and Platform number 2 have been removed. The wooden station building remains, but is unattended.

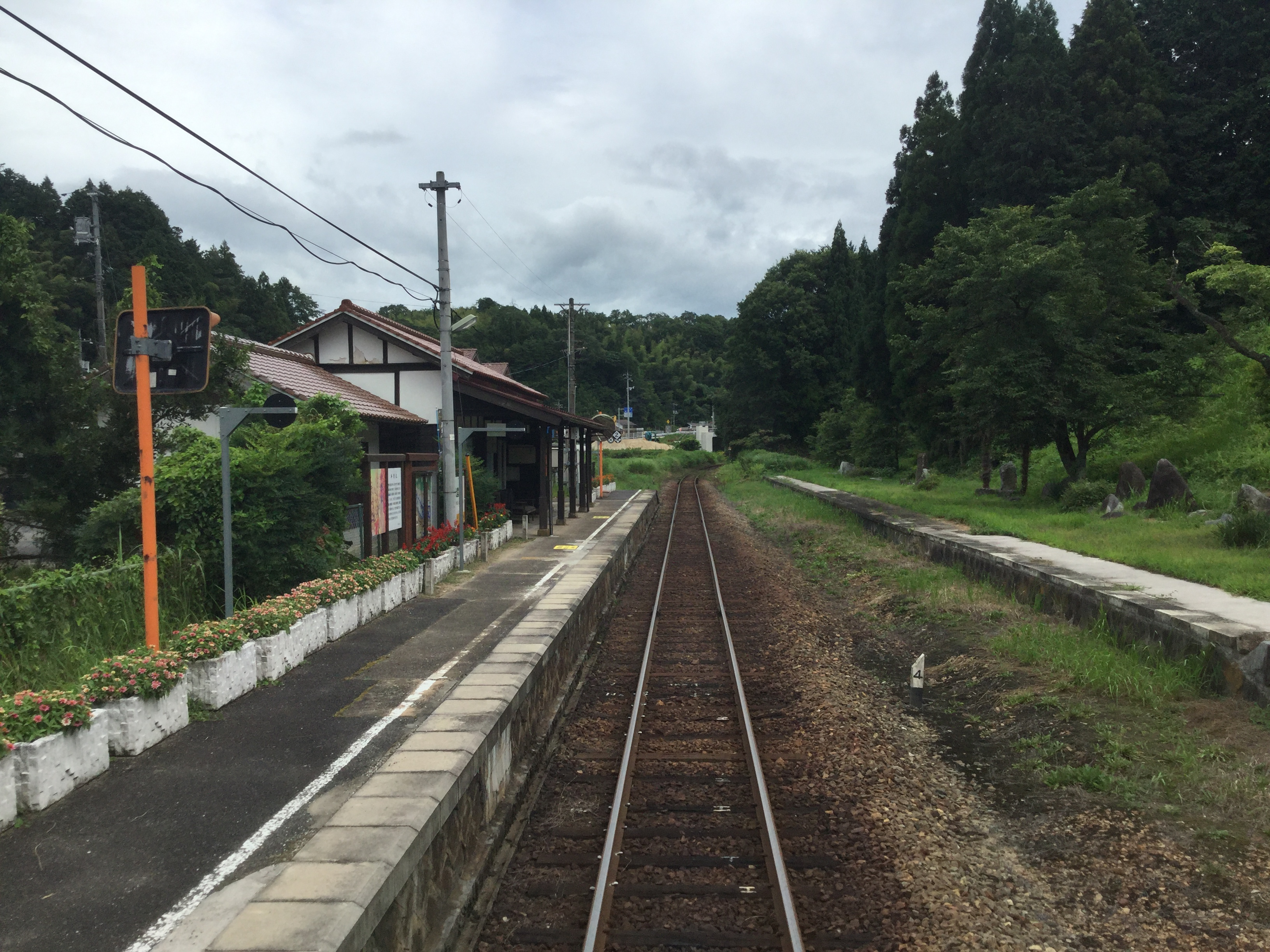
Station platform, 2019

== History ==
Izumo Yashiro Station was opened on 18 December 1932 when the extension between Kisuki Station and Izumo Minari Station on the Kisuki Line was completed. It became part of JR West on 1 April 1987 when Japan National Railways was privatized.

== Passenger statistics ==
In fiscal 2019, the station was used by an average of 12 passengers daily.

== Surrounding area ==
It is located in a mountainous area, and there are private houses scattered in front of the station. Shimane Prefectural Route 25 Tamayu Azumayama Line runs behind the station.

== See also ==
- List of railway stations in Japan
