= Hataya Station =

Railway station in Unnan, Shimane Prefecture, Japan

Hataya Station 幡屋駅
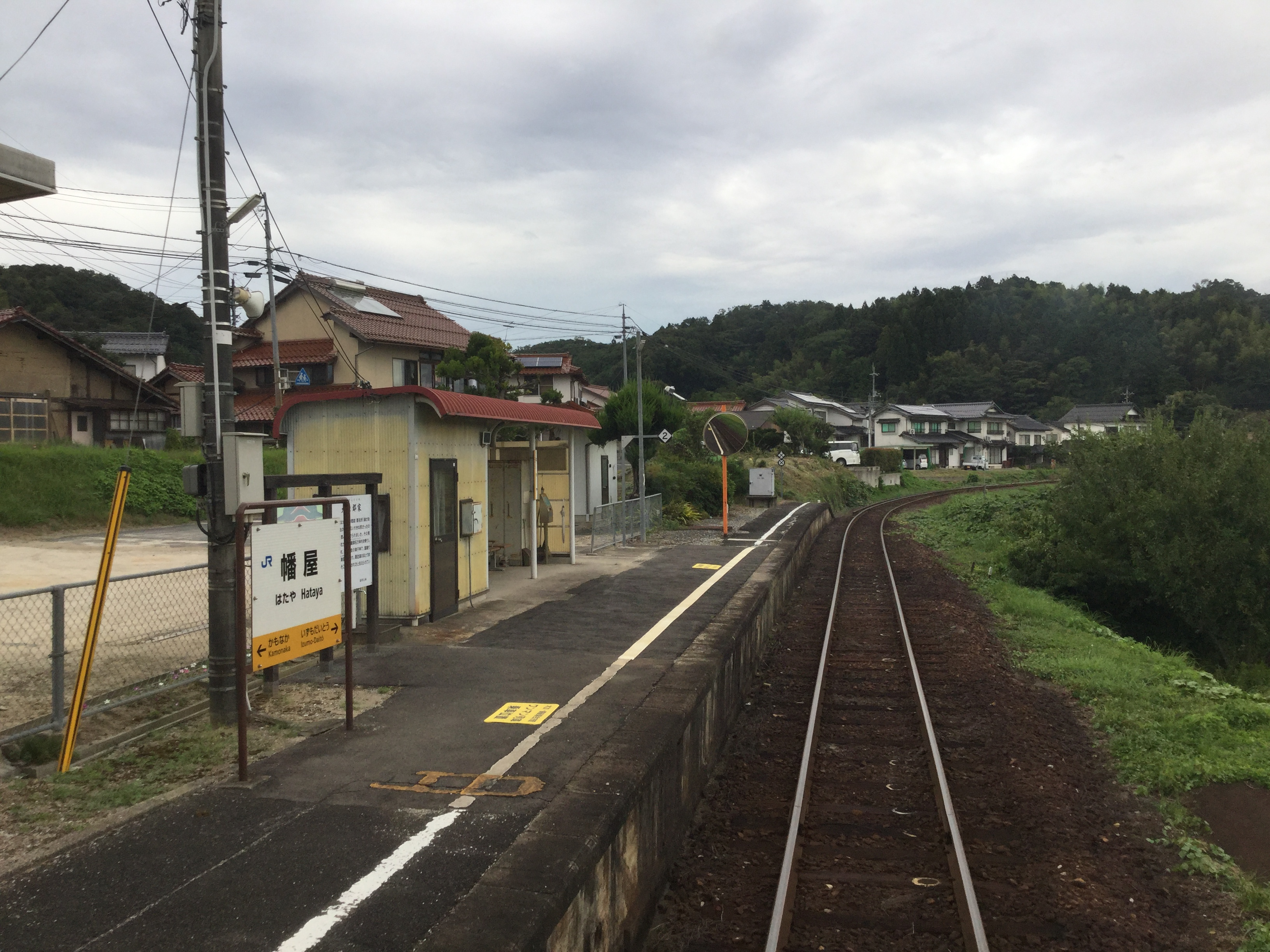
- Hataya Station, August 2019

General information
- Location: 1886, Daitō-chō Ninnaji, Unnan-shi, Shimane-ken 699-1232; Japan
- Coordinates: 35°20′5.4″N 132°56′21.72″E
- Operator: JR West
- Line: E Kisuki Line
- Distance: 11.8 km (7.3 miles) from Shinji
- Platforms: 1 side platform
- Tracks: 1

Other information
- Status: Unstaffed
- Website: Official website

History
- Opened: 2 November 1918

Passengers
- 2020: 26 daily

Services
Preceding station	JR West	Following station
Kamonaka towards Shinji	Kisuki Line	Izumo Daitō towards Bingo Ochiai
Location
- Location within Shimane Prefecture Location within Japan

Hataya Station (幡屋駅, Hataya-eki) is a passenger railway station located in the city of Unnan, Shimane Prefecture, Japan. It is operated by the West Japan Railway Company (JR West).

== Lines ==
Hataya Station is served by the Kisuki Line, and is located 11.8 kilometers from the terminus of the line at Shinji.

== Station layout ==
The station consists of one ground-level side platform located on the north side of the track (on the left side when facing Bingo-Ochiai. There is no station building and the station is unattended.

== History ==
Hataya Station was opened on 2 November 1918 on the Hinokami Railway. The railway was nationalized on 12 December 1932, becoming the Kisuki Line. It became part of JR West on April 1, 1987 when Japan National Railways was privatized.

== Passenger statistics ==
In fiscal 2019, the station was used by an average of 26 passengers daily.

== Surrounding area ==
- Suwa Shrine
- Shimane Prefectural Route 157 Izumo Daito Line

== See also ==
- List of railway stations in Japan
