= Hinobori Station =

Railway station in Unnan, Shimane Prefecture, Japan

Hinobori Station 日登駅
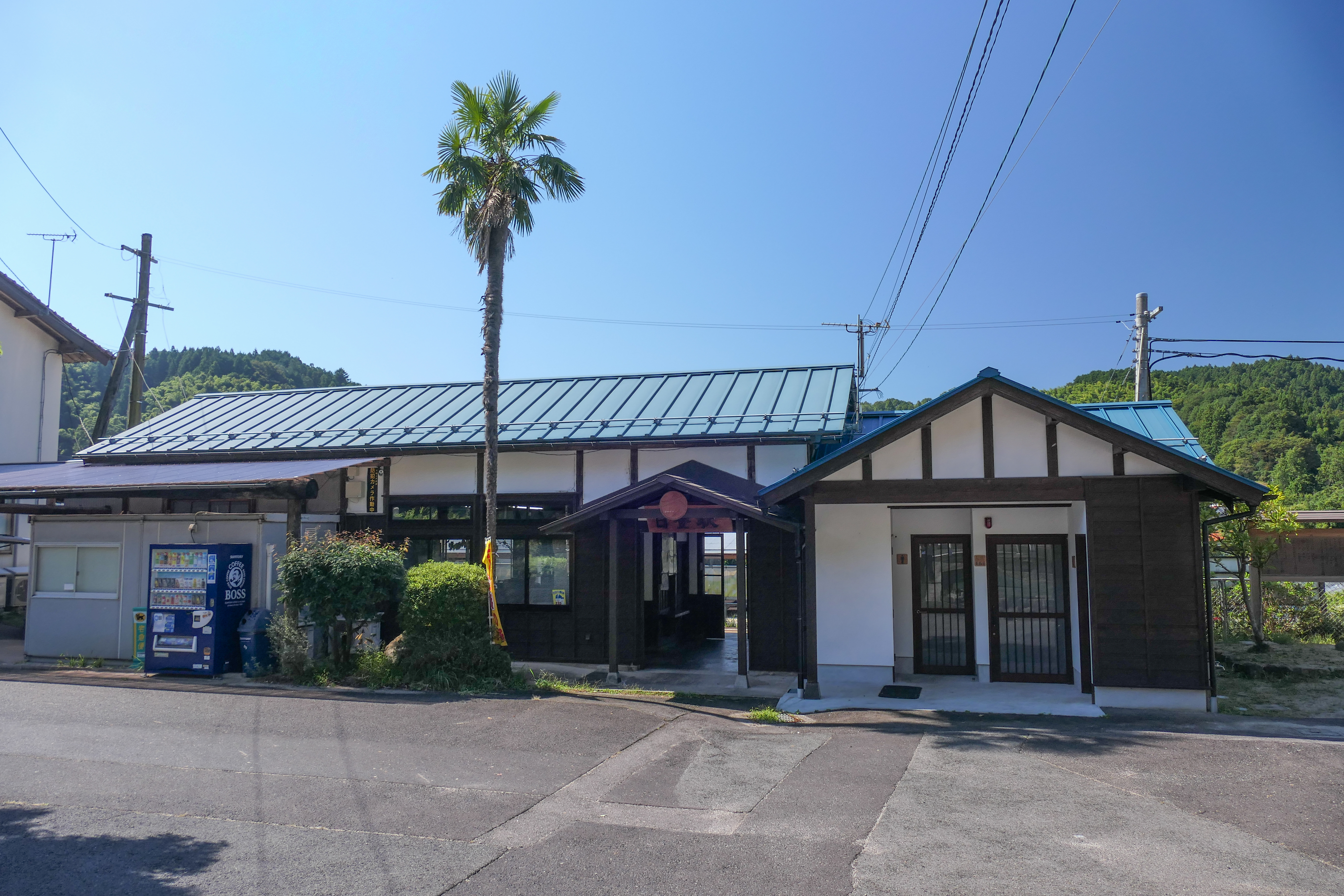
- Hinobori Station, October 2020

General information
- Location: 472, Kisuki-chō Jiryō, Unnan-shi, Shimane-ken 699-1322; Japan
- Coordinates: 35°16′35.18″N 132°55′52.32″E
- Operator: JR West
- Line: E Kisuki Line
- Distance: 24.8 km (15.4 miles) from Shinji
- Platforms: 1 side platform
- Tracks: 1

Other information
- Status: Staffed
- Website: Official website

History
- Opened: 18 December 1932

Passengers
- FY2020: 3 daily

Services
Preceding station	JR West	Following station
Kisuki towards Shinji	Kisuki Line	Shimokuno towards Bingo Ochiai
Location
- Location within Shimane Prefecture Location within Japan

Hinobori Station (日登駅, Hinobori-eki) is a passenger railway station located in the city of Unnan, Shimane Prefecture, Japan. It is operated by the West Japan Railway Company (JR West).

== Lines ==
Hinobori Station is served by the Kisuki Line, and is located 24.8 kilometers from the terminus of the line at Shinji.

== Station layout ==
The station consists of one ground-level side platform and one track on the left side facing Bingo-Ochiai. The station office is the office of Itamochi Civil Engineering (a construction company), which staffs the station on a consignment basis.

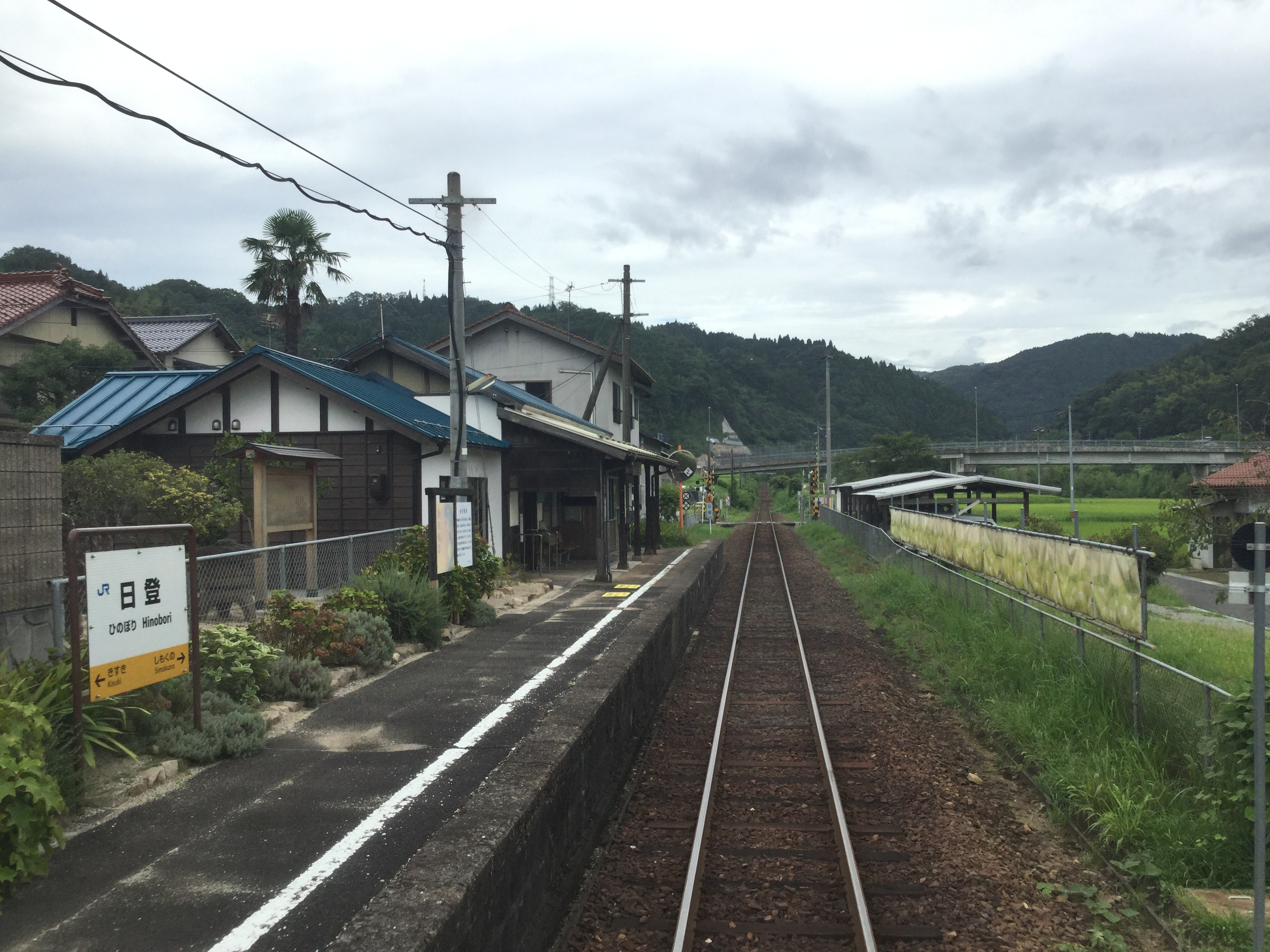
Station platform, 2019

== History ==
Hinobori Station was opened on 18 December 1932 when the extension between Kisuki Station and Izumo Minari Station on the Kisuki Line was completed. It became part of JR West on 1 April 1987 when Japan National Railways was privatized.

== Passenger statistics ==
In fiscal 2019, the station was used by an average of 3 passengers daily.

== Surrounding area ==
- Unnan City Jiryo Elementary School
- Shimane Prefectural Road No. 45 Yasugi-Kitsugi Line
- Kuno River

== See also ==
- List of railway stations in Japan
