= Yuki Station (Hiroshima) =

Railway station in Shōbara, Hiroshima Prefecture, Japan

Yuki Station 油木駅
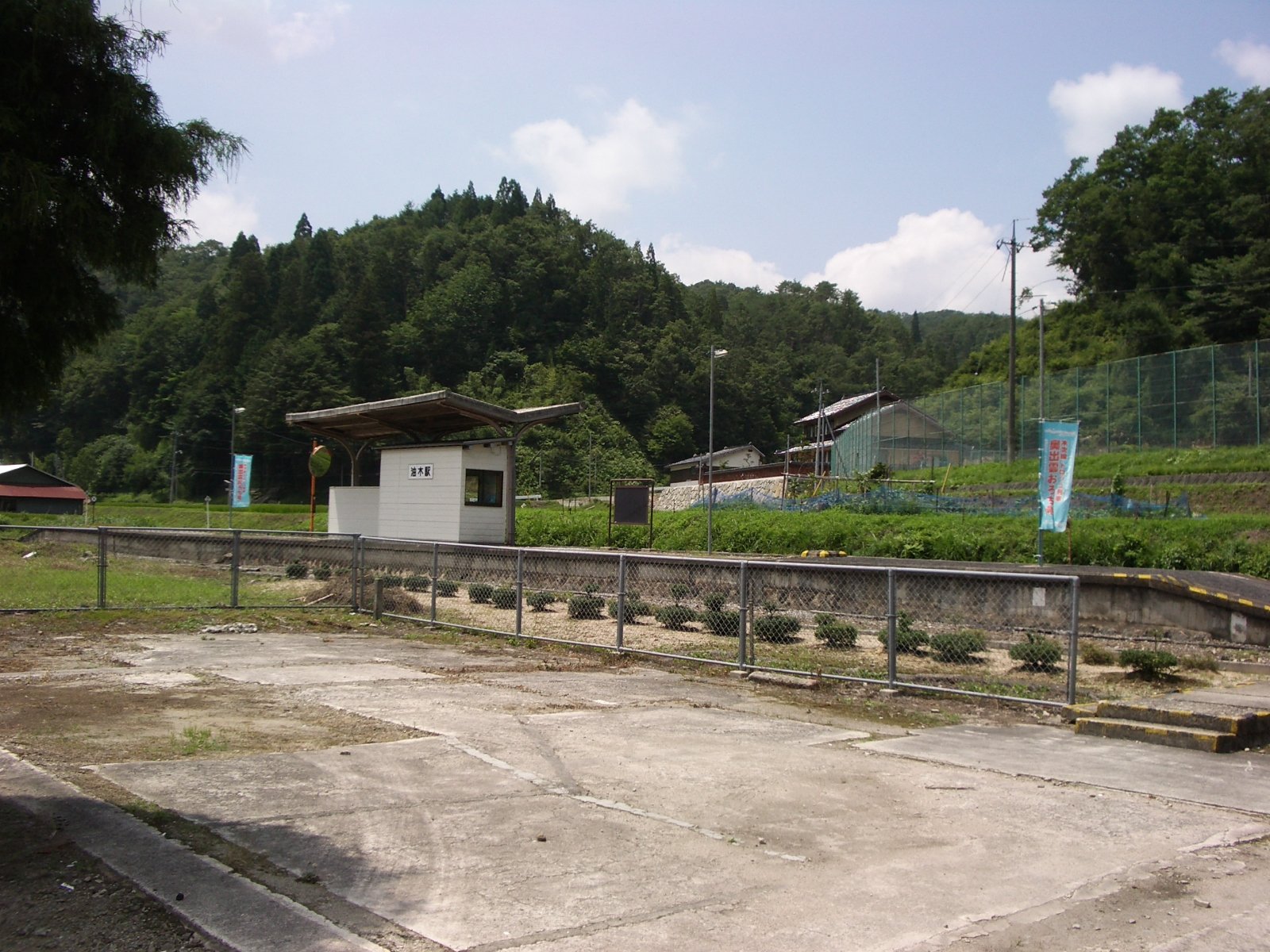
- Station platform (August 2005)

General information
- Location: 326 Yuki, Saijō-chō, Shōbara-shi, Hiroshima-ken 729-5602; Japan
- Coordinates: 35°2′40.33″N 133°7′9.61″E
- Operator: JR West
- Line: E Kisuki Line
- Distance: 75.3 km (46.8 miles) from Shinji
- Platforms: 1 side platform
- Tracks: 1

Other information
- Status: Unstaffed
- Website: Official website

History
- Opened: 8 December 1923

Passengers
- 2019: 2 daily

Services
Preceding station	JR West	Following station
Miinohara towards Shinji	Kisuki Line	Bingo-Ochiai towards Bingo Ochiai
Location
- Location within Hiroshima Prefecture Location within Japan

Yuki Station (油木駅, Yuki-eki) is a passenger railway station located in the city of Shōbara, Hiroshima Prefecture, Japan. It is operated by the West Japan Railway Company (JR West).

== Lines ==
Yuki Station is served by the Kisuki Line, and is located 75.3 kilometers from the terminus of the line at Shinji.

== Station layout ==
The station consists of one ground-level opposed side platform serving a single bi-directional track. It was constructed as an island platform, but the track on one side has been removed. There is no station building and the station is unattended.

== Adjacent stations ==
«	Service	»
Kisuki Line
Miinohara	Local	Bingo-Ochiai

== History ==
Yuki Station was opened on December 12, 1937 when the extension between Yagawa Station and Bingo-Ochiai Station on the Kisuki Line was completed. It became part of JR West on April 1, 1987 when Japan National Railways was privatized.

== Passenger statistics ==
In fiscal 2019, the station was used by an average of 2 passengers daily.

== Surrounding area ==
- Japan National Route 314

== See also ==
- List of railway stations in Japan
