= Shimokuno Station =

Railway station in Unnan, Shimane Prefecture, Japan

Shimokuno Station 下久野駅
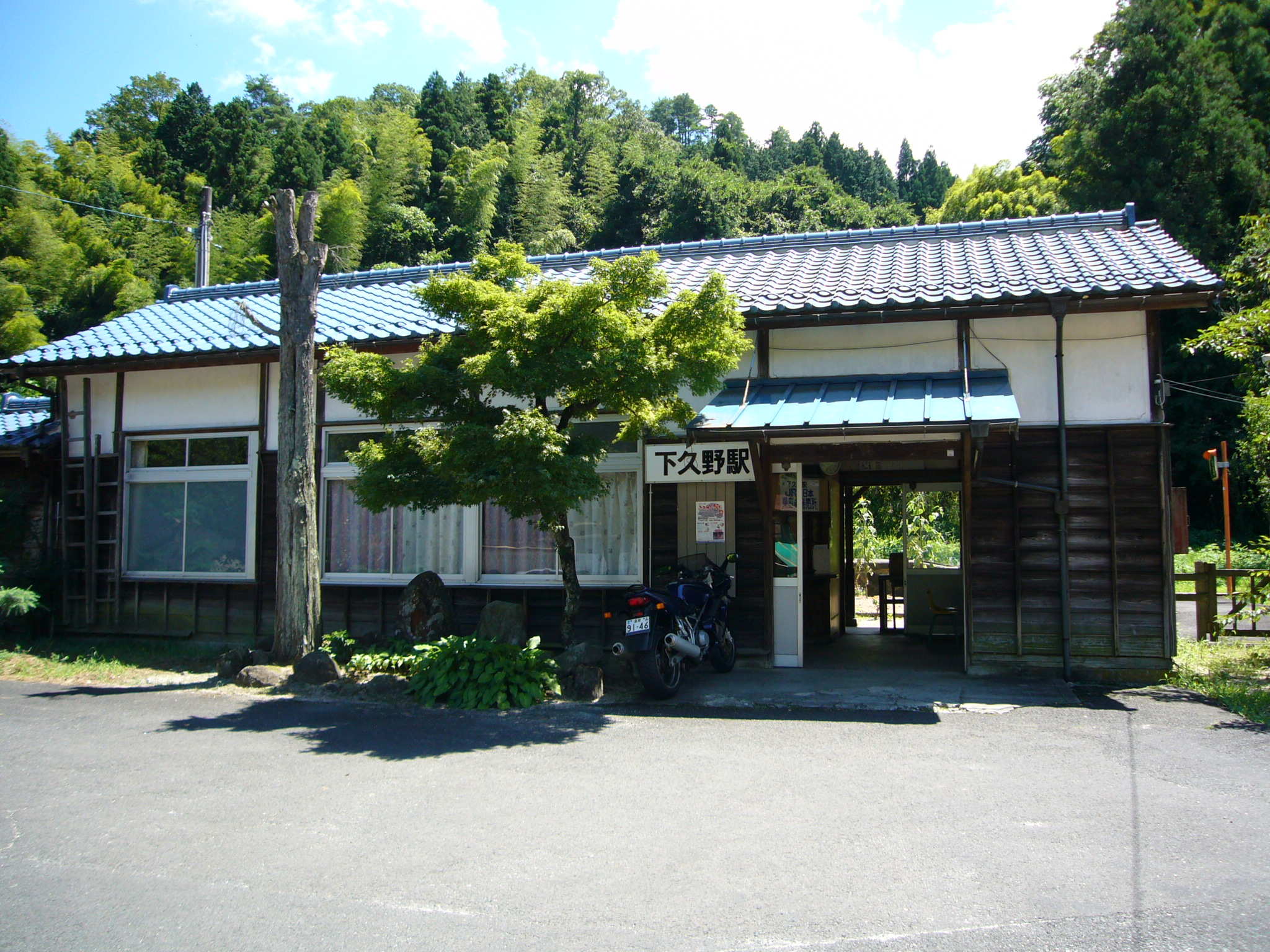
- Shimokuno Station, August 2008

General information
- Location: 691 Daitō-chō Shimokuno, Unnan-shi, Shimane-ken 699-1212; Japan
- Coordinates: 35°15′53.24″N 132°59′32.13″E
- Operator: JR West
- Line: E Kisuki Line
- Distance: 31.5 km (19.6 miles) from Shinji
- Platforms: 1 side platform
- Tracks: 1

Other information
- Status: Staffed
- Website: Official website

History
- Opened: 18 December 1932

Passengers
- 2020: 2 daily

Services
Preceding station	JR West	Following station
Hinobori towards Shinji	Kisuki Line	Izumo Yashiro towards Bingo Ochiai
Location
- Location within Shimane Prefecture Location within Japan

Shimokuno Station (下久野駅, Shimokuno-eki) is a passenger railway station located in the city of Unnan, Shimane Prefecture, Japan. It is operated by the West Japan Railway Company (JR West).

== Lines ==
Shimokuno Station is served by the Kisuki Line, and is located 31.5 kilometers from the terminus of the line at Shinji.

== Station layout ==
The station consists of one ground-level side platform and one track on the left side facing Bingo-Ochiai. It used to have one island platform and two tracks, but the one track near the station building was removed. The station is managed by the local resident group "Hanamomo Station". The site of the railroad track between the station building and platform is used as a field to grow vegetables.

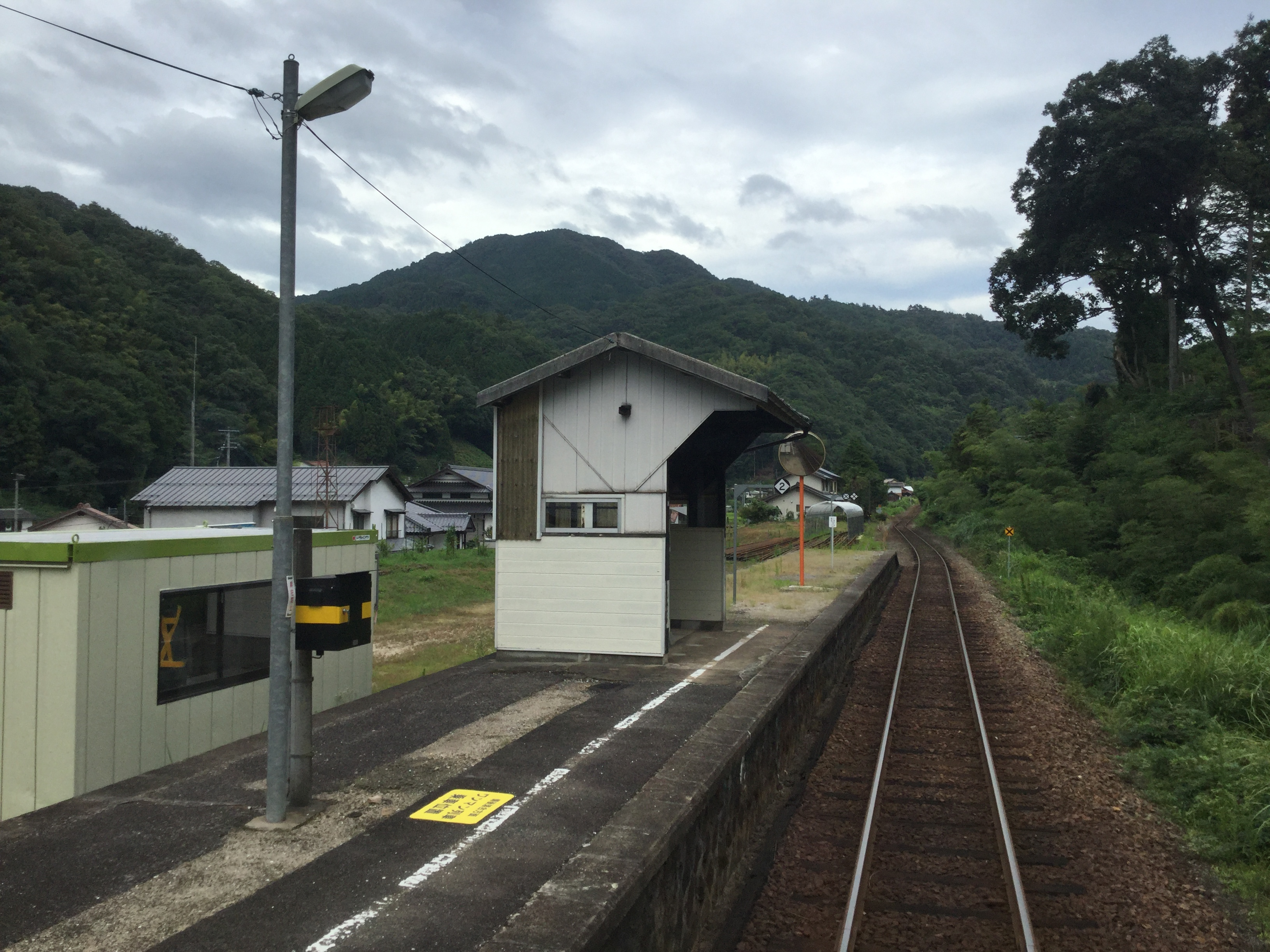
Station platform, 2019

== History ==
Shimokuno Station was opened on 18 December 1932 when the extension between Kisuki Station and Izumo Minari Station on the Kisuki Line was completed. It became part of JR West on 1 April 1987 when Japan National Railways was privatized.

== Passenger statistics ==
In fiscal 2019, the station was used by an average of 2 passengers daily.

== Surrounding area ==
The station is located in the narrow valley of the Kuno River, which stretches from east to west. The station is located on the south bank of the Kuno River, and Shimane Prefectural Road No. 45 Yasugi-Kitsugi Line passes through the opposite bank. Shimane Prefectural Road 216 Shimokuno Station Line, which connects the station and Shimane Prefectural Road 45, crosses the Kuno River at Shimokuno Bridge.

== See also ==
- List of railway stations in Japan
