= Izumo Daitō Station =

Railway station in Unnan, Shimane Prefecture, Japan

Izumo Daitō Station 出雲大東駅
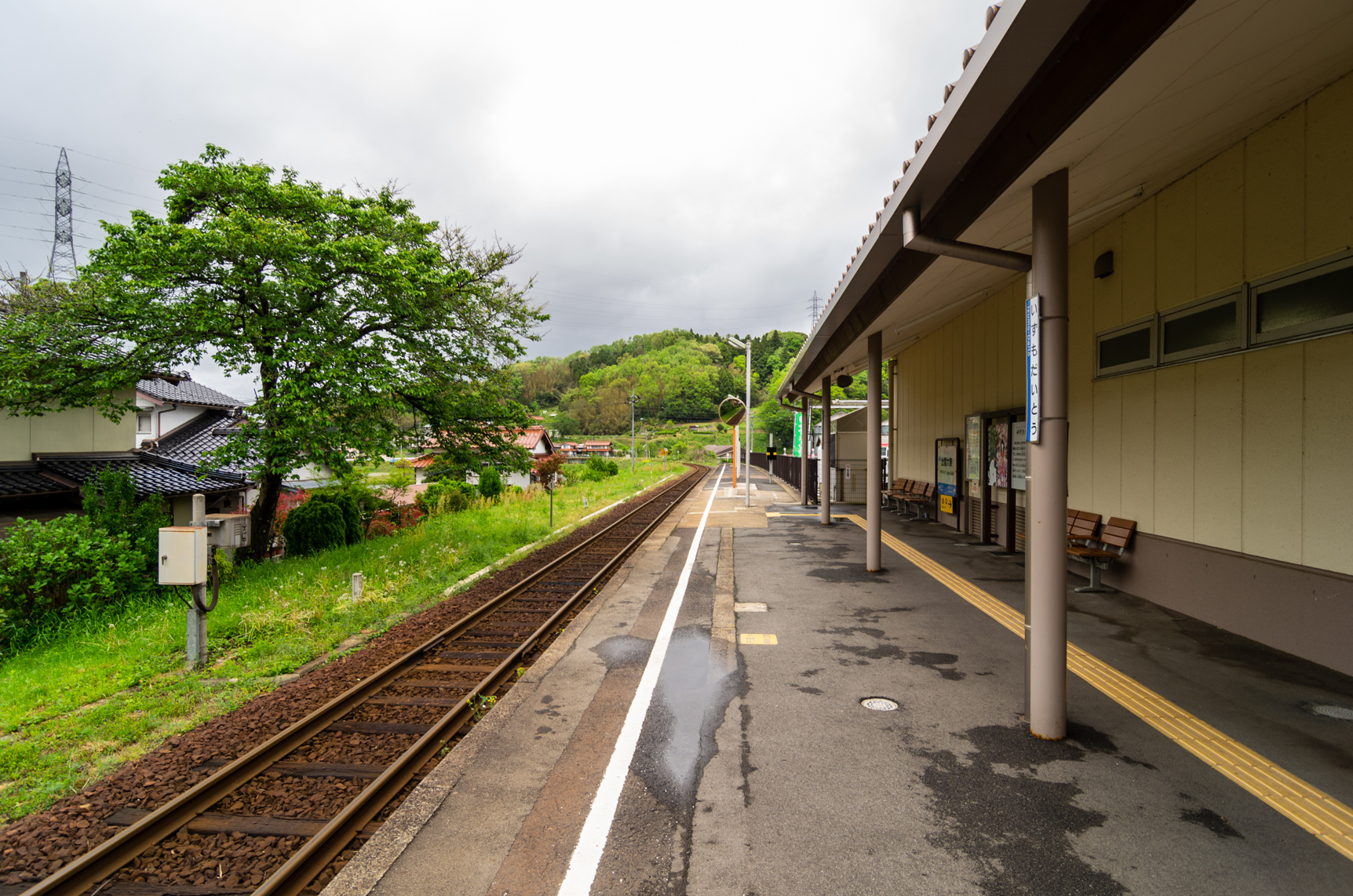
- Izumo Daitō Station, May 2012

General information
- Location: 38, Daitō-chō Iida, Unnan-shi, Shimane-ken 699-1221; Japan
- Coordinates: 35°19′30.93″N 132°57′28.71″E
- Operator: JR West
- Line: E Kisuki Line
- Distance: 13.9 km (8.6 miles) from Shinji
- Platforms: 1 side platform
- Tracks: 1

Other information
- Status: Staffed
- Website: Official website

History
- Opened: 11 October 1916
- Former names: Daitōchō Station (to 1932)

Passengers
- 2020: 118 daily

Services
Preceding station	JR West	Following station
Hataya towards Shinji	Kisuki Line	Minami Daitō towards Bingo Ochiai
Location
- Location within Shimane Prefecture Location within Japan

Izumo Daitō Station (出雲大東駅, Izumo Daitō-eki) is a passenger railway station located in the city of Unnan, Shimane Prefecture, Japan. It is operated by the West Japan Railway Company (JR West).

== Lines ==
Izumo Daitō Station is served by the Kisuki Line, and is located 13.9 kilometers from the terminus of the line at Shinji.

== Station layout ==
The station consists of one ground-level side platform located on the south side of the track (on the left side when facing Bingo-Ochiai. It used to have an island platform with two tracks, but one track was removed during the construction of a new station building in 2007. The station building has a sales office specializing in Yunnan specialities and the station is staffed on consignment.

== History ==
Izumo Daitō Station was opened on 11 October 1916 as Daitōchō Station (大東町駅) on the Hinokami Railway. The railway was nationalized on 12 December 1932, becoming the Kisuki Line, and the line was extended to Izumo Minari Station. The station was renamed at that time. It became part of JR West on 1 April 1987 when Japan National Railways was privatized.

== Passenger statistics ==
In fiscal 2019, the station was used by an average of 118 passengers daily.

== Surrounding area ==
- Unnan Municipal Hospital
- Shimane Prefectural Daito High School

== See also ==
- List of railway stations in Japan
