= Minami Daitō Station =

Railway station in Unnan, Shimane Prefecture, Japan

Minami Daitō Station 南大東駅
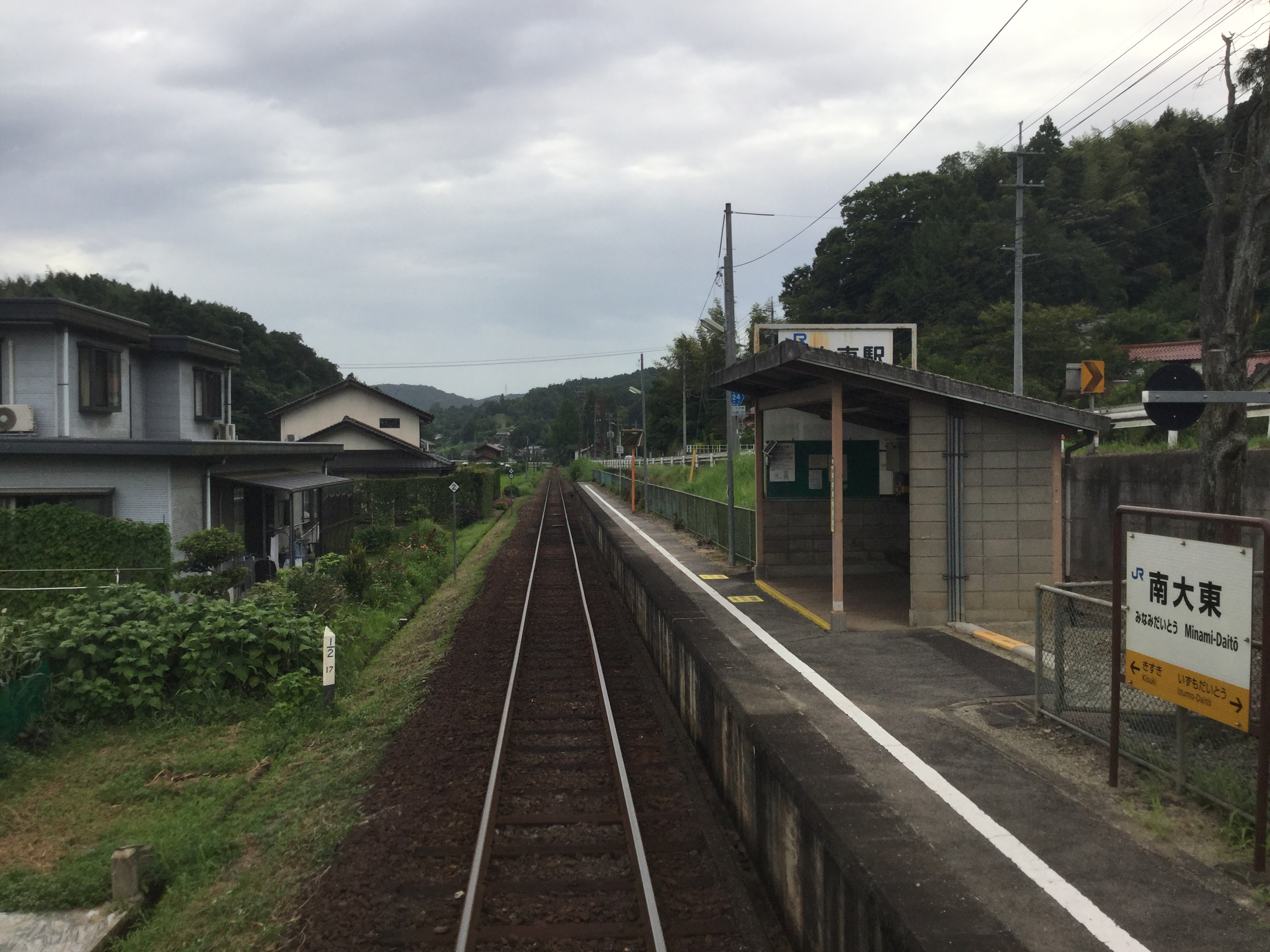
- Minami Daitō Station, August 2019

General information
- Location: 546, Daitō-chō Kamizase, Unnan-shi, Shimane-ken 699-1214; Japan
- Coordinates: 35°18′28.83″N 132°55′41.45″E
- Operator: JR West
- Line: E Kisuki Line
- Distance: 17.5 km (10.9 miles) from Shinji
- Platforms: 1 side platform
- Tracks: 1

Other information
- Status: Unstaffed
- Website: Official website

History
- Opened: 1 October 1963

Passengers
- 2019: 7 daily

Services
Preceding station	JR West	Following station
Izumo Daitō towards Shinji	Kisuki Line	Kisuki towards Bingo Ochiai
Location
- Location within Shimane Prefecture Location within Japan

Minami Daitō Station (南大東駅, Minami Daitō-eki) is a passenger railway station located in the city of Unnan, Shimane Prefecture, Japan. It is operated by the West Japan Railway Company (JR West).

== Lines ==
Minami Daitō Station is served by the Kisuki Line, and is located 17.5 kilometers from the terminus of the line at Shinji.

== Station layout ==
The station consists of one ground-level side platform located on the north side of the track (on the right side when facing Bingo-Ochiai. There is no station building, and a waiting shelter is located in the middle of the platform

== History ==
Minami Daitō Station was opened on 1 October 1963. It became part of JR West on 1 April 1987 when Japan National Railways was privatized.

== Passenger statistics ==
In fiscal 2019, the station was used by an average of 7 passengers daily.

== Surrounding area ==
- Shimane Prefectural Route 24 Matsue Kisuki Line

== See also ==
- List of railway stations in Japan
