= Minami Shinji Station =

Railway station in Matsue, Shimane Prefecture, Japan

Minami Shinji Station 南宍道駅
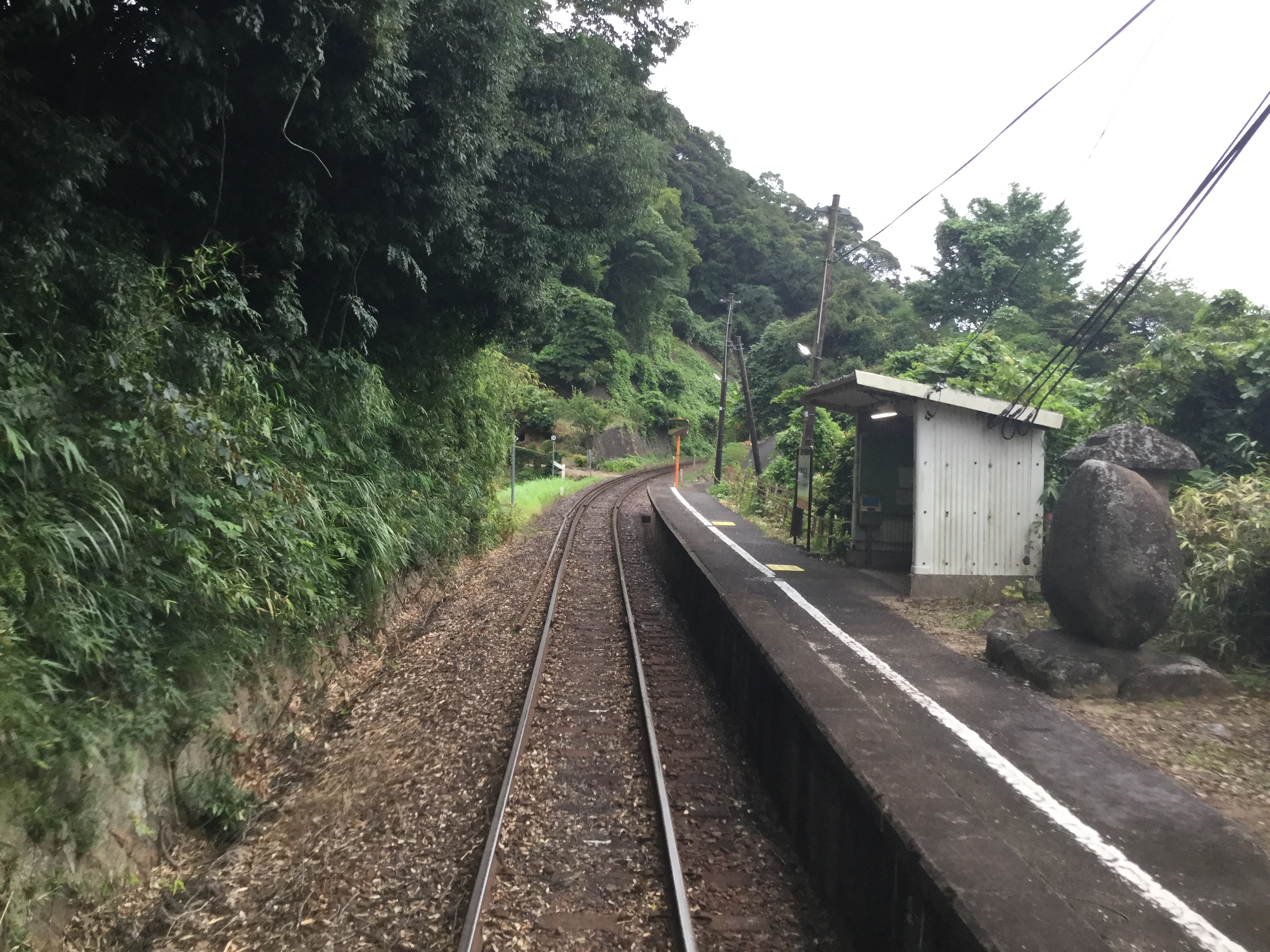
- Minami Shinji Station, February 2019

General information
- Location: 1606, Shinji-chō Hakuishi, Matsue-shi, Shimane-ken 699-0402; Japan
- Coordinates: 35°22′47.66″N 132°55′7.02″E
- Operator: JR West
- Line: E Kisuki Line
- Distance: 3.6 km (2.2 miles) from Shinji
- Platforms: 1 side platform
- Tracks: 1

Other information
- Status: Staffed
- Website: Official website

History
- Opened: 1 January 1962

Passengers
- FY2020: 2 daily

Services
Preceding station	JR West	Following station
Shinji Terminus	Kisuki Line	Kamonaka towards Bingo Ochiai
Location
- Location within Shimane Prefecture Location within Japan

Minami Shinji Station (南宍道駅, Minami Shinji-eki) is a passenger railway station located in the city of Matsue, Shimane Prefecture, Japan. It is operated by the West Japan Railway Company (JR West).

== Lines ==
Minami Shinji Station is served by the Kisuki Line, and is located 3.6 kilometers from the terminus of the line at Shinji.

== Station layout ==
The station consists of one ground-level side platform and one track on the right side facing Bingo-Ochiai. The platform is located on a slope, and is at a high position relative to the surrounding roads. There is no station building, and the station is unattended.

== History ==
Minami Shinji Station was opened on 1 January 1962. It became part of JR West on 1 April 1987 when Japan National Railways was privatized.

== Passenger statistics ==
In fiscal 2019, the station was used by an average of 2 passengers daily.

== Surrounding area ==
- Kanayama Mountain Fortress
- Kanayama Hachiman Shrine

== See also ==
- List of railway stations in Japan
