= Okuizumo =

Okuizumo 奥出雲町
- Town
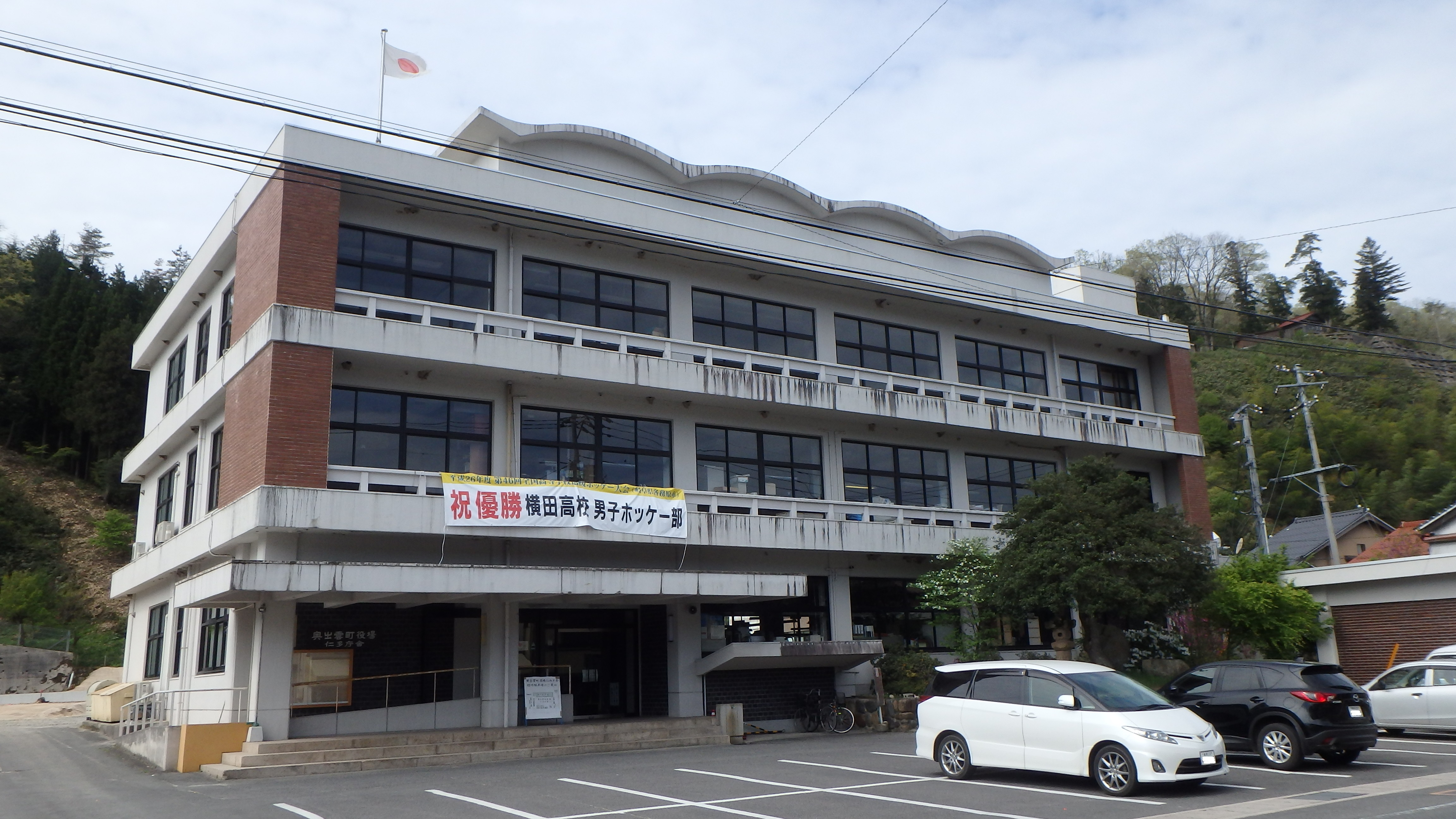
- Okuizumo Town Hall

- Flag Seal

- Location of Okuizumo in Shimane Prefecture

- Location in Japan
- Coordinates: 35°11′51″N 133°0′9″E
- Country: Japan
- Region: Chūgoku; San'in
- Prefecture: Shimane
- District: Nita

Area
  - Total: 368.01 km^{2} (142.09 sq mi)

Population (August 1, 2023)
  - Total: 11,056
  - Density: 30.043/km^{2} (77.810/sq mi)
- Time zone: UTC+09:00 (JST)
- City hall address: 358-1 Mitsunari, Okuizumo-cho, Nita-gun, Shimane-ken 699-1592
- Climate: Cfa
- Website: Official website
- Symbols
- Flower: Rhododendron subg. Hymenanthes
- Tree: Maple

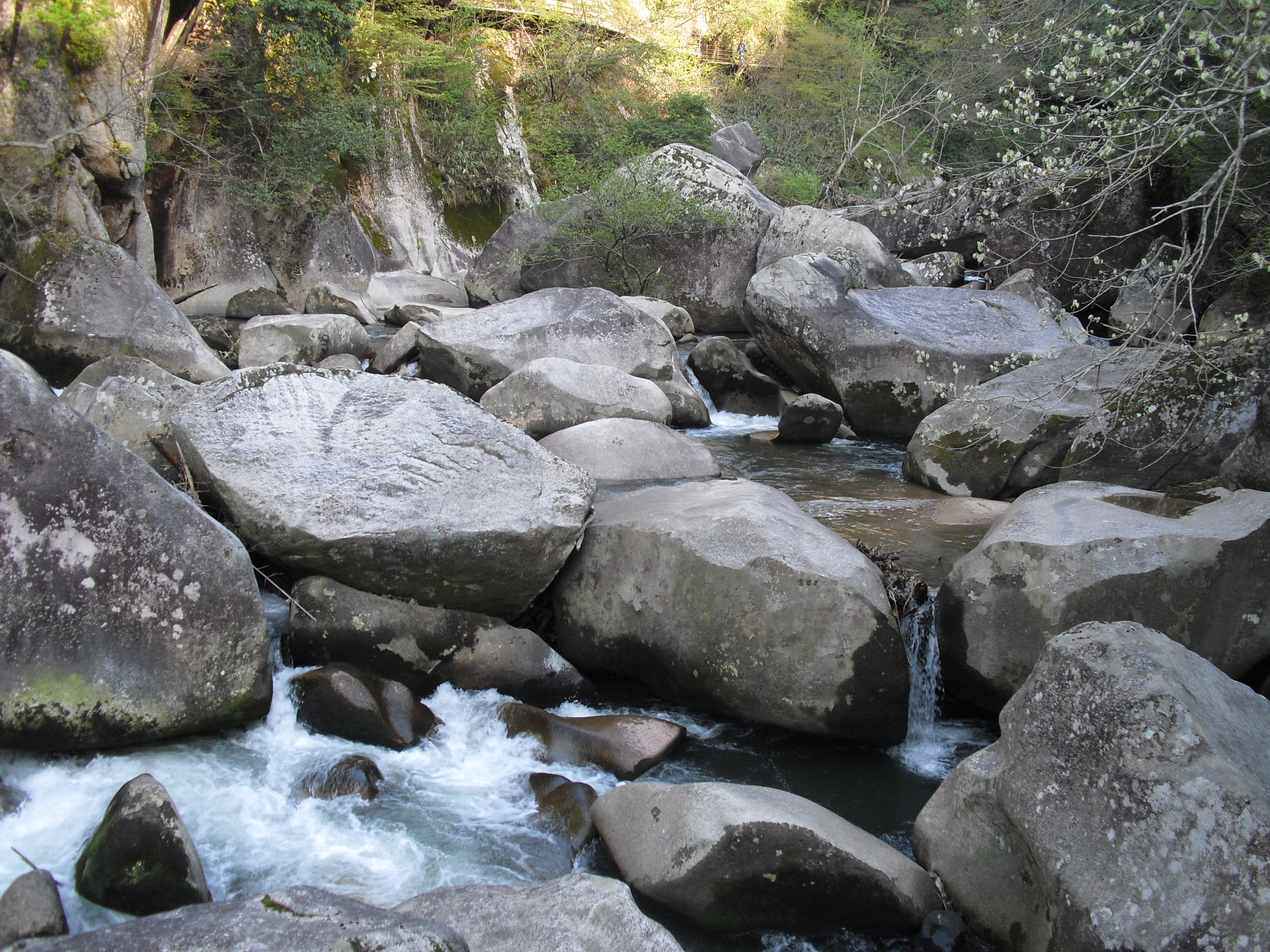
Oni-no-Shitaburui Falls

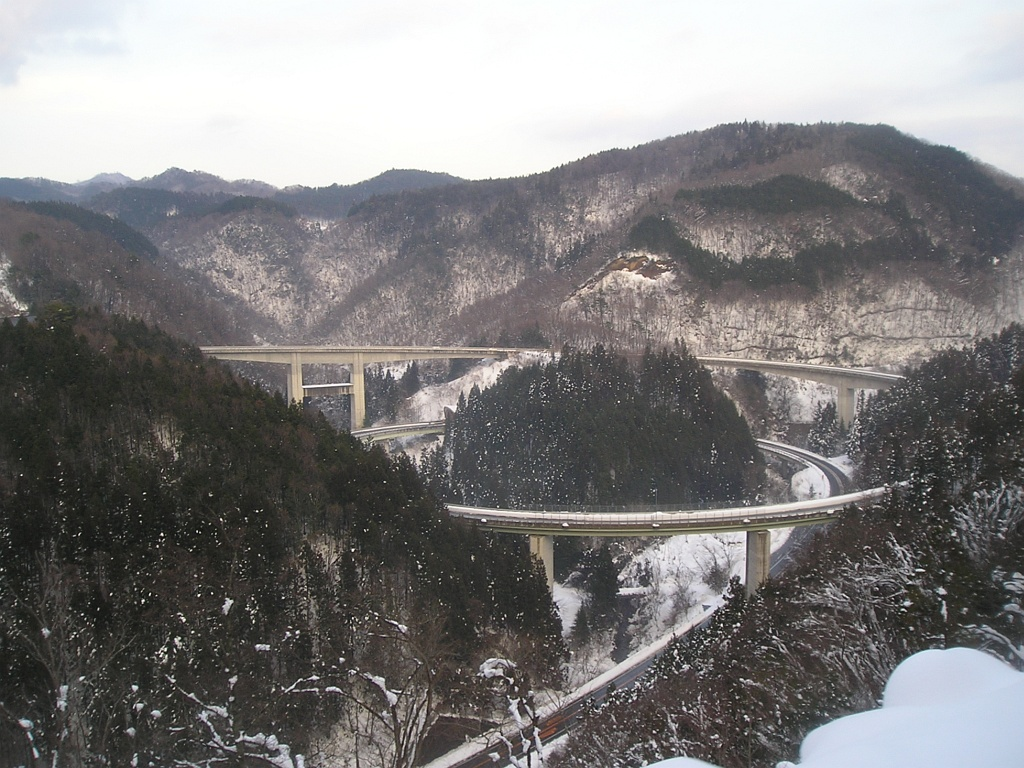
Okuizumo Orochi Loop bridge

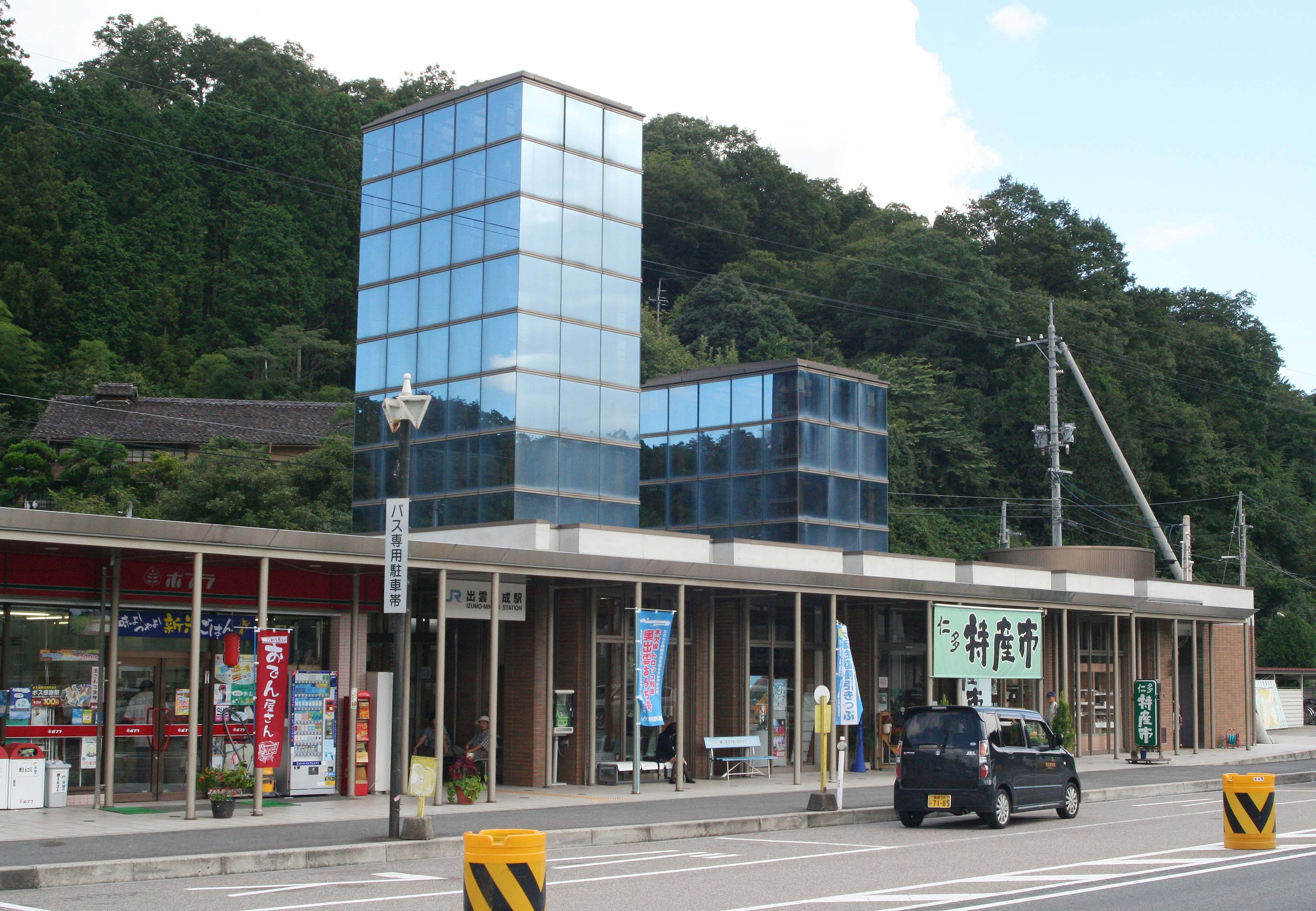
Izumo Minari Station

Okuizumo (奥出雲町, Okuizumo-chō) is a town located in Nita District, Shimane Prefecture, Japan. As of August 1, 2023, the town has a population of 11,056 and a density of 30 persons per km^{2}. The area of the town is 368.01 square kilometres (142.09 sq mi).

== Geography ==
Okuizumo is located in the mountains of North East Shimane. The steep mountains are limited to the area near the prefectural border and the border with Unnan, and the entire town is covered in heavy snowfall. The area is the headwaters of the Hii River, and the main mountains include Mt. Sarumasa (1267m), which is the highest peak in the Izumo region. Parts of the town are within the borders of the Hiba-Dogo-Taishaku Quasi-National Park.

== Neighboring municipalities ==
Hiroshima Prefecture

- Shōbara

Shimane Prefecture

- Unnan
- Yasugi

Tottori Prefecture

- Nichinan

=== Climate ===
Okuizumo has a humid subtropical climate (Köppen climate classification Cfa) with very warm summers and cool winters. Precipitation is abundant throughout the year. The average annual temperature in Okuizumo is 12.3 °C (54.1 °F). The average annual rainfall is 1,754.6 mm (69.08 in) with July as the wettest month. The temperatures are highest on average in August, at around 24.6 °C (76.3 °F), and lowest in January, at around 0.7 °C (33.3 °F). The highest temperature ever recorded in Okuizumo was 36.3 °C (97.3 °F) on 19 August 2010; the coldest temperature ever recorded was −13.1 °C (8.4 °F) on 28 February 1981.

Climate data for Yokota, Okuizumo (1991−2020 normals, extremes 1978−present)
Month	Jan	Feb	Mar	Apr	May	Jun	Jul	Aug	Sep	Oct	Nov	Dec	Year
Record high °C (°F)	16.1 (61.0)	21.0 (69.8)	23.2 (73.8)	30.5 (86.9)	32.7 (90.9)	33.8 (92.8)	35.4 (95.7)	36.3 (97.3)	35.7 (96.3)	30.3 (86.5)	25.5 (77.9)	21.4 (70.5)	36.3 (97.3)
Mean daily maximum °C (°F)	4.9 (40.8)	6.2 (43.2)	11.0 (51.8)	17.6 (63.7)	22.7 (72.9)	25.7 (78.3)	29.0 (84.2)	30.3 (86.5)	25.6 (78.1)	20.1 (68.2)	14.3 (57.7)	7.8 (46.0)	17.9 (64.3)
Daily mean °C (°F)	0.7 (33.3)	1.4 (34.5)	5.0 (41.0)	10.7 (51.3)	16.1 (61.0)	20.0 (68.0)	23.9 (75.0)	24.6 (76.3)	20.2 (68.4)	14.0 (57.2)	8.4 (47.1)	3.1 (37.6)	12.3 (54.2)
Mean daily minimum °C (°F)	−2.9 (26.8)	−3.0 (26.6)	−0.5 (31.1)	3.9 (39.0)	9.7 (49.5)	15.0 (59.0)	19.8 (67.6)	20.2 (68.4)	15.8 (60.4)	8.8 (47.8)	3.3 (37.9)	−0.8 (30.6)	7.4 (45.4)
Record low °C (°F)	−12.2 (10.0)	−13.1 (8.4)	−10.6 (12.9)	−5.2 (22.6)	−1.6 (29.1)	4.7 (40.5)	7.5 (45.5)	11.4 (52.5)	2.5 (36.5)	−0.7 (30.7)	−4.5 (23.9)	−11.5 (11.3)	−13.1 (8.4)
Average precipitation mm (inches)	143.1 (5.63)	114.4 (4.50)	129.5 (5.10)	106.4 (4.19)	114.2 (4.50)	178.0 (7.01)	237.3 (9.34)	154.0 (6.06)	210.7 (8.30)	131.1 (5.16)	96.1 (3.78)	139.7 (5.50)	1,754.6 (69.08)
Average snowfall cm (inches)	155 (61)	128 (50)	34 (13)	0 (0)	0 (0)	0 (0)	0 (0)	0 (0)	0 (0)	0 (0)	3 (1.2)	86 (34)	401 (158)
Average precipitation days (≥ 1.0 mm)	18.6	15.4	14.9	11.0	10.2	12.2	13.6	10.9	12.1	10.4	12.5	17.7	159.5
Average snowy days (≥ 3 cm)	13.5	12.6	3.2	0	0	0	0	0	0	0	0.2	7.2	36.7
Mean monthly sunshine hours	52.8	68.4	132.4	180.5	201.8	149.0	152.5	182.2	130.6	135.4	100.6	63.6	1,549.8
Source: Japan Meteorological Agency

=== Demographics ===
Per Japanese census data, the population of Okuizumo in 2020 is 11,849 people. Okuizumo has been conducting censuses since 1920.

Historical population
Year	Pop.	±%
1920	21,431	—
1925	21,805	+1.7%
1930	22,303	+2.3%
1935	24,248	+8.7%
1940	25,198	+3.9%
1945	26,782	+6.3%
1950	27,908	+4.2%
1955	28,477	+2.0%
1960	26,820	−5.8%
1965	23,501	−12.4%
1970	20,878	−11.2%
1975	19,398	−7.1%
1980	19,057	−1.8%
1985	18,706	−1.8%
1990	18,100	−3.2%
1995	17,426	−3.7%
2000	16,689	−4.2%
2005	15,812	−5.3%
2010	14,458	−8.6%
2015	13,063	−9.6%
2020	11,849	−9.3%
Okuizumo population statistics

== History ==
The area of Okuizumo was the center of ancient Izumo Province, and was one of the early centers of Tatara steel production from the Kofun period. During the Edo Period, the area was mostly under the control of Matsue Domain, which was ruled mostly by various branches of the Matsudaira clan under the Tokugawa shogunate. After the Meiji restoration, the village of Minari (三成村) was established on April 1, 1889, with the creation of the modern municipalities system. It was raised to town status on July 1, 1941. Minari merged with four surrounding villages to form the town of Nita (仁多町) on April 15, 1955. The town of Okuizumo was formed on March 31, 2005, from the merger of the towns of Nita and Yokota.

== Government ==
Okuizumo has a mayor-council form of government with a directly elected mayor and a unicameral town council of 14 members. Okuizumo contributes one member to the Shimane Prefectural Assembly. In terms of national politics, the town is part of the Shimane 1st district of the lower house of the Diet of Japan.

== Economy ==
The economy of Okuizumo is centered on agriculture and forestry. Komaki mine was used to produce tungsten from 1911 to 1984.

== Education ==
Okuizumo has ten public elementary school and two public junior high schools operated by the city government, and one public high schools operated by the Shimane Prefectural Board of Education.

== Transportation ==
=== Railway ===
JR West (JR West) - Kisuki Line

- Izumo Yashiro - Izumo Minari - Kamedake - Izumo Yokota - Yakawa - Izumo Sakane - Miinohara

=== Highways ===
- National Route 314
- National Route 432
