= Kisuki Line =

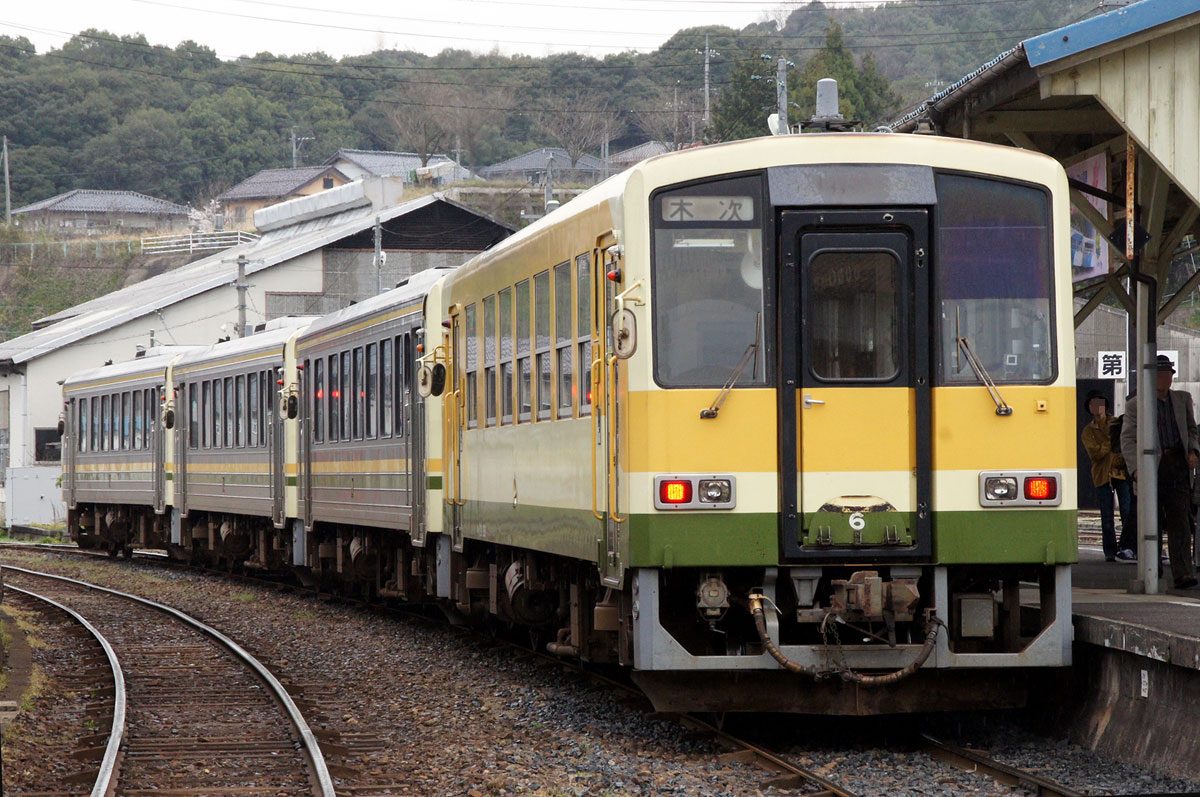
- KiHa 120 DMUs on the Kisuki Line in April 2012

Overview
- Native name: 木次線
- Status: In operation
- Locale: Shimane and Hiroshima Prefectures
- Termini: Shinji; Bingo Ochiai
- Stations: 18

Service
- Type: Regional rail
- Operator: JR West
- Rolling stock: KiHa 120 series DMU

History
- Opened: 18 December 1932; 93 years ago

Technical
- Line length: 81.9 km (50.9 mi)
- Num of tracks: Entire line single tracked
- Character: Rural
- Track gauge: 1,067 mm (3 ft 6 in)
- Electrification: None
- Operating speed: 75 km/h (47 mph)

The Kisuki Line (木次線, Kisuki-sen) is a Japanese railway line operated by West Japan Railway Company (JR West). The 81.9 km (50.9 mi) line connects Shinji in Matsue, Shimane with Bingo Ochiai in Shōbara, Hiroshima.

== Stations ==
Station	Japanese	Between (km)	Distance (km)	Connections	Location	
Shinji	宍道	-	0.0	Sanin Main Line	Matsue	Shimane Prefecture
Minami Shinji	南宍道	3.6	3.6		Matsue	Shimane Prefecture
Kamonaka	加茂中	5.1	8.7		Unnan	Shimane Prefecture
Hataya	幡屋	3.1	11.8		Unnan	Shimane Prefecture
Izumo Daitō	出雲大東	2.1	13.9		Unnan	Shimane Prefecture
Minami Daitō	南大東	3.6	17.5		Unnan	Shimane Prefecture
Kisuki	木次	3.6	21.1		Unnan	Shimane Prefecture
Hinobori	日登	3.7	24.8		Unnan	Shimane Prefecture
Shimokuno	下久野	6.7	31.5		Unnan	Shimane Prefecture
Izumo Yashiro	出雲八代	5.9	37.4		Okuizumo; Nita District	Shimane Prefecture
Izumo Minari	出雲三成	4.1	41.5		Okuizumo; Nita District	Shimane Prefecture
Kamedake	亀嵩	4.4	45.9		Okuizumo; Nita District	Shimane Prefecture
Izumo Yokota	出雲横田	6.4	52.3		Okuizumo; Nita District	Shimane Prefecture
Yakawa	八川	4.0	56.3		Okuizumo; Nita District	Shimane Prefecture
Izumo Sakane	出雲坂根	7.0	63.3		Okuizumo; Nita District	Shimane Prefecture
Miinohara	三井野原	6.4	69.7		Okuizumo; Nita District	Shimane Prefecture
Yuki	油木	5.6	75.3		Shōbara	Hiroshima Prefecture
Bingo Ochiai	備後落合	6.6	81.9	Geibi Line	Shōbara	Hiroshima Prefecture

Four〜10 Diesel trains are operated every day. There are more trains between Shinji and Kisuki, but few between Kisuki and Bingoochiai. In winter season, operation often suspend because of lots of snow.

== Rolling stock ==
- KiHa 120 series DMUs
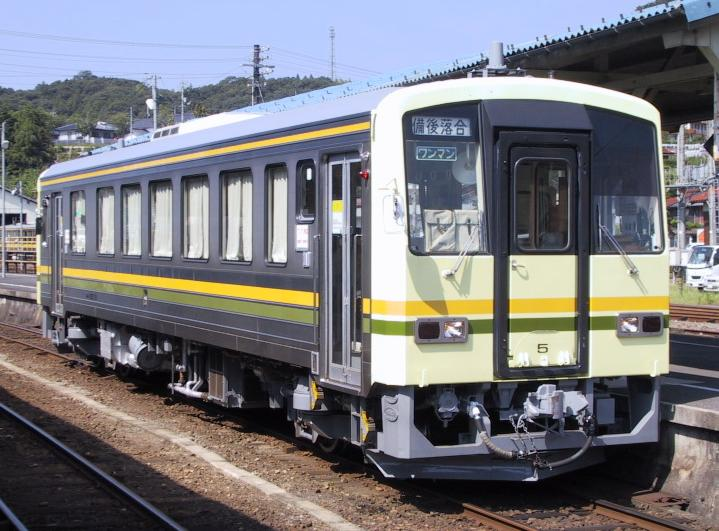
A Kisuki Line KiHa 120-0 diesel car

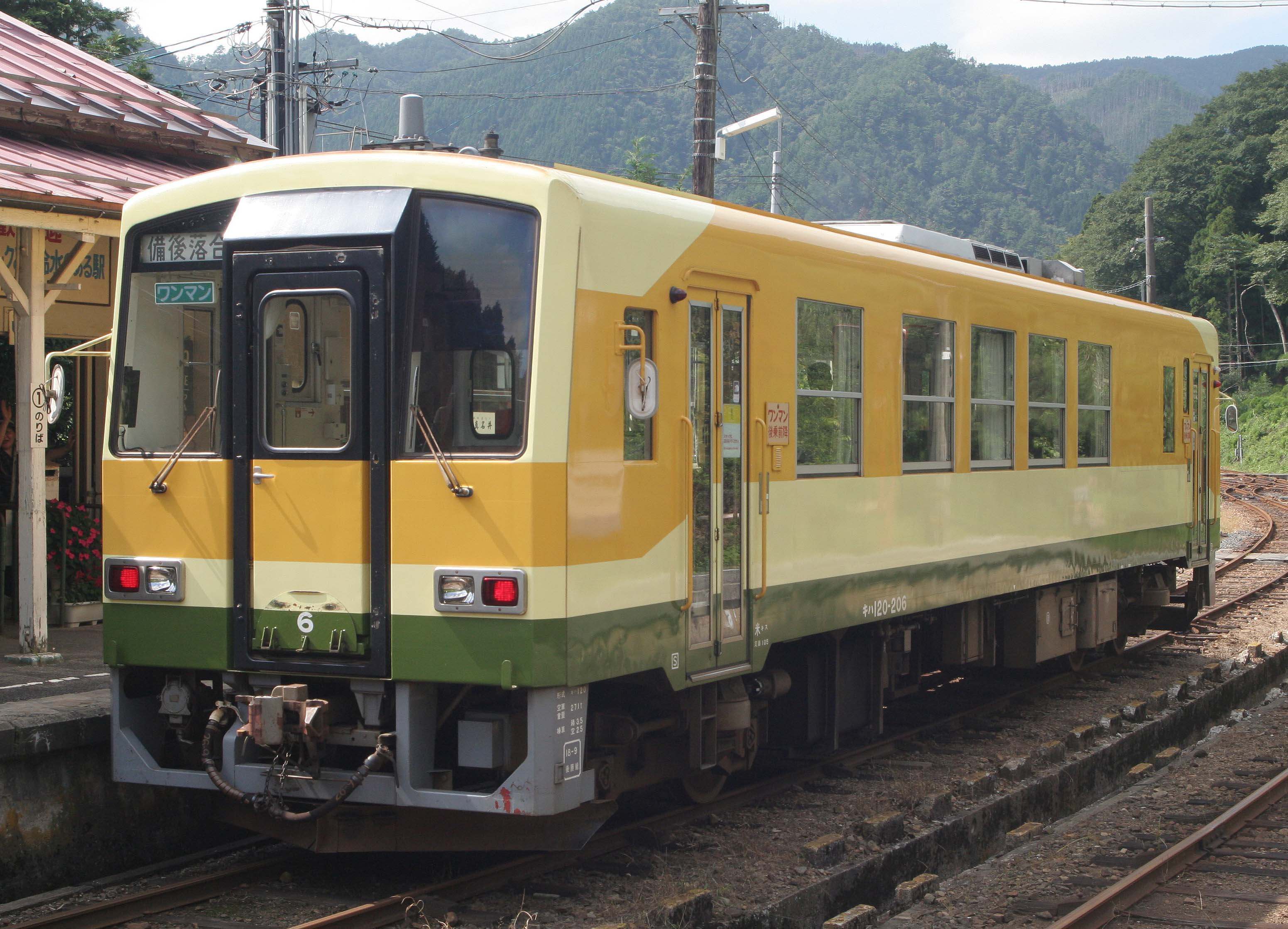
A Kisuki Line KiHa 120-200 diesel car in September 2007

== Access ==
1. Shinji Station

 JR
   from Tokyo or Osaka

Tokaido and Sanyo Shinkansen and Hakubi line, limited express Yakumo via Okayama Station

     sleeper train Sunrise Izumo
   from Fukuoka : Sanyo Shinkansen and Sanin line, limited express Oki via Shinyamaguchi station

 Airline (Izumo Enmusubi Airport)
  from Haneda or Osaka or Nagoya or Fukuoka
  to the Station by taxi

2. Bingoochiai Station

  from Hiroshima : Geibi line
  from Okayama : Hakubi line, limited express Yakumo and Geibi line via Niimi station

== History ==
The line's history started with the Hinokami Railway, which ran between Shinji and Kisuki and was opened on 11 October 1916. The railway was renamed the Kisuki Line in December 1932, and on 18 December 1932 was extended further south to Izumo Minari. A further extension was made to Yakawa on 20 November 1934, and the final part of the line to Bingo Ochiai was completed on 12 December 1937, including a switch-back at Izumo Sakane.

With the privatization of Japanese National Railways (JNR) on 1 April 1987, the line was transferred to the control of JR West.

== See also ==
- List of railway lines in Japan
