= Nita, Shimane =

Town in Japan

Nita 仁多町
- Town
- Interactive map of Nita
- Country: Japan
- Prefecture: Shimane
- District: Nita
- Merged: January 31, 2005 (now part of Okuizumo)

Area
  - Total: 178.64 km^{2} (68.97 sq mi)

Population (2003)
  - Total: 8,507
  - Density: 47.62/km^{2} (123.3/sq mi)
- Time zone: UTC+09:00 (JST)

Nita (仁多町, Nita-chō) was a town located in Nita District, Shimane Prefecture, Japan.

As of 2003, the town had an estimated population of 8,507 and a density of 47.62 persons per km^{2}. The total area was 178.64 km^{2}.

On March 31, 2005, Nita, along with the town of Yokota (also from Nita District), was merged to create the town of Okuizumo.
