= Nita District, Shimane =

District in Shimane Prefecture, Japan

Coordinates: 35.187°N 133.059°E

Location of Nita District in Shimane Prefecture

Nita (仁多郡, Nita-gun) is a district located in Shimane Prefecture, Japan.

As of 2003, the district has an estimated population of 16,253 and a density of 44.16 persons per km^{2}. The total area is 368.06 km^{2}.

== Towns and villages ==
- Okuizumo

== Merger ==
- On March 31, 2005, the towns of Nita and Yokota merged to form the new town of Okuizumo.
