= Japan National Route 314 =

Road in Japan

National Route 314
- 国道314号
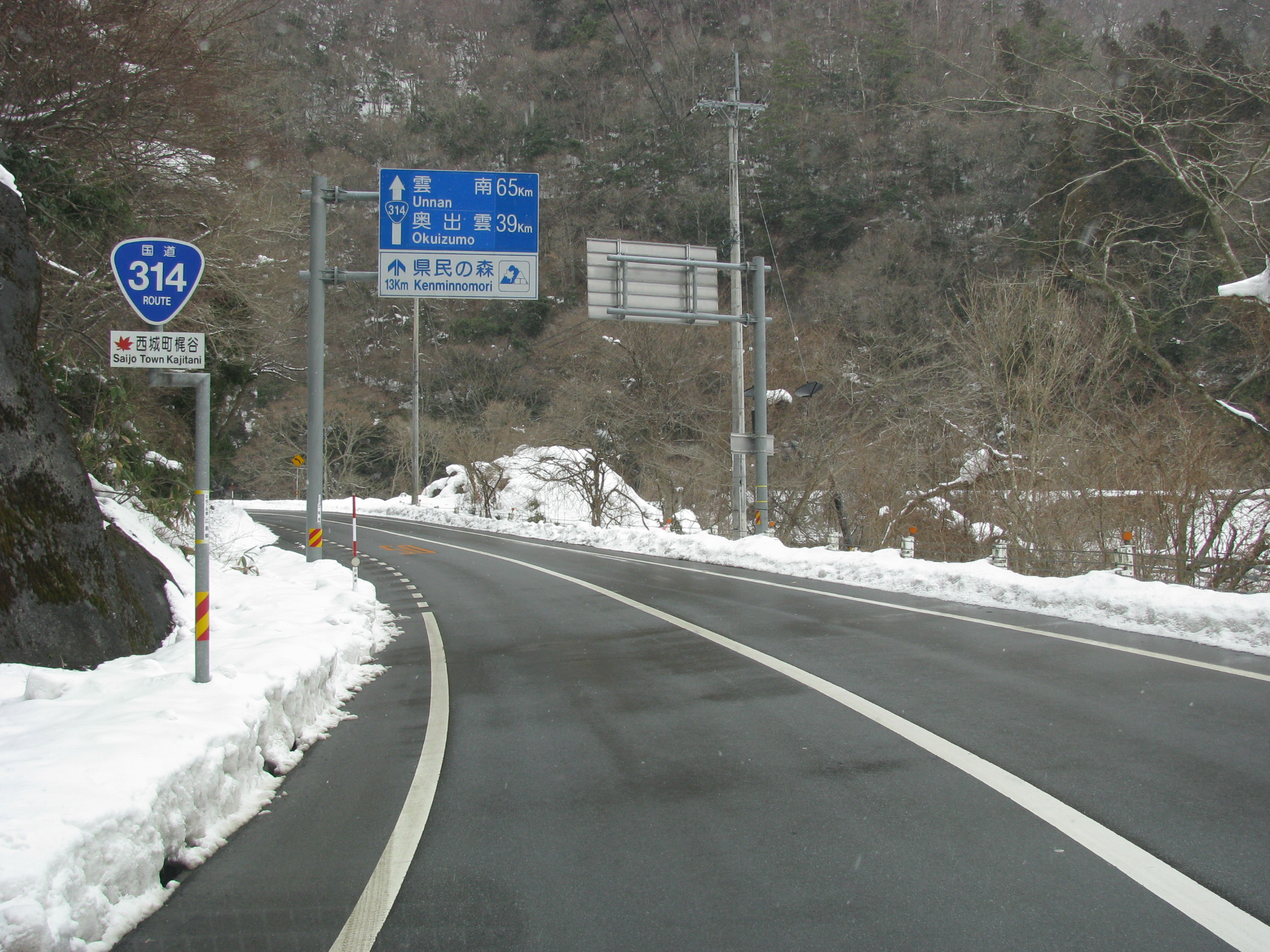

Route information
- Length: 142.4 km (88.5 mi)

Location
- Country: Japan

Highway system
- National highways of Japan; Expressways of Japan
← National Route 313	→ National Route 315

National Route 314 is a national highway of Japan connecting Fukuyama, Hiroshima and Unnan, Shimane in Japan, with a total length of 142.4 km (88.48 mi).
