= Shinji Station =

Railway station in Matsue, Shimane Prefecture, Japan

Shinji Station 宍道駅
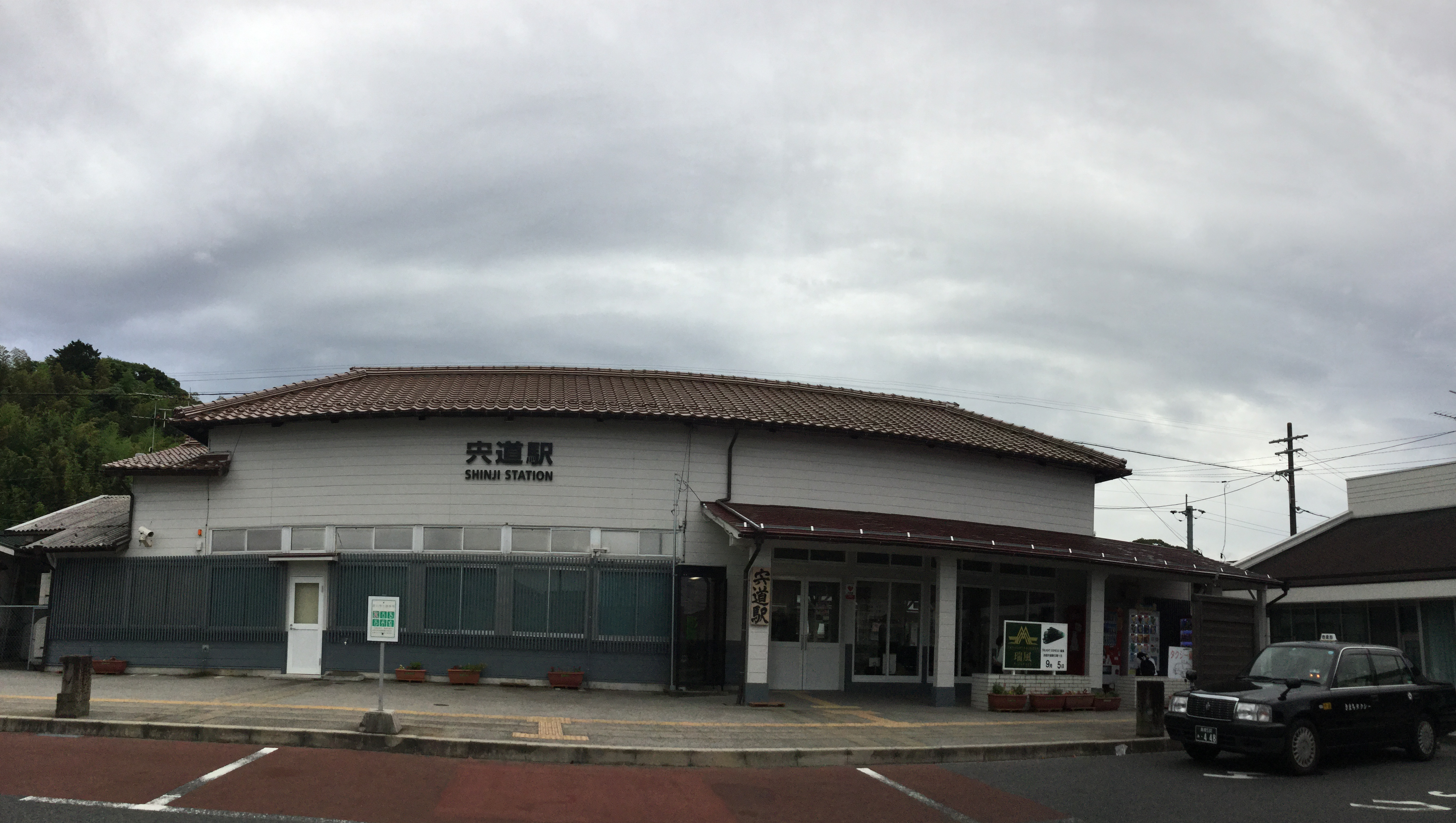
- Shinji Station, 2019

General information
- Location: 908 Shinji, Shinji-cho, Matsue-shi, Shimane-ken 699-0624; Japan
- Coordinates: 35°24′24.86″N 132°54′33.4″E
- Owner: West Japan Railway Company
- Operator: West Japan Railway Company
- Lines: D San'in Main Line; E Kisuki Line
- Distance: 368.9 km (229.2 miles) from Kyoto
- Platforms: 1 side + 1 island platforms
- Tracks: 3
- Connections: Bus stop

Other information
- Status: Staffed
- Website: Official website

History
- Opened: 7 November 1909

Passengers
- FY 2020: 488 daily (boarding only)

Services
Preceding station	JR West	Following station
Shōbara towards Shimonoseki	San'in Main Line D	Kimachi towards Masuda
Terminus	Kisuki Line	Minami-Shinji towards Bingo Ochiai
Location
- Location within Shimane Prefecture Location within Japan

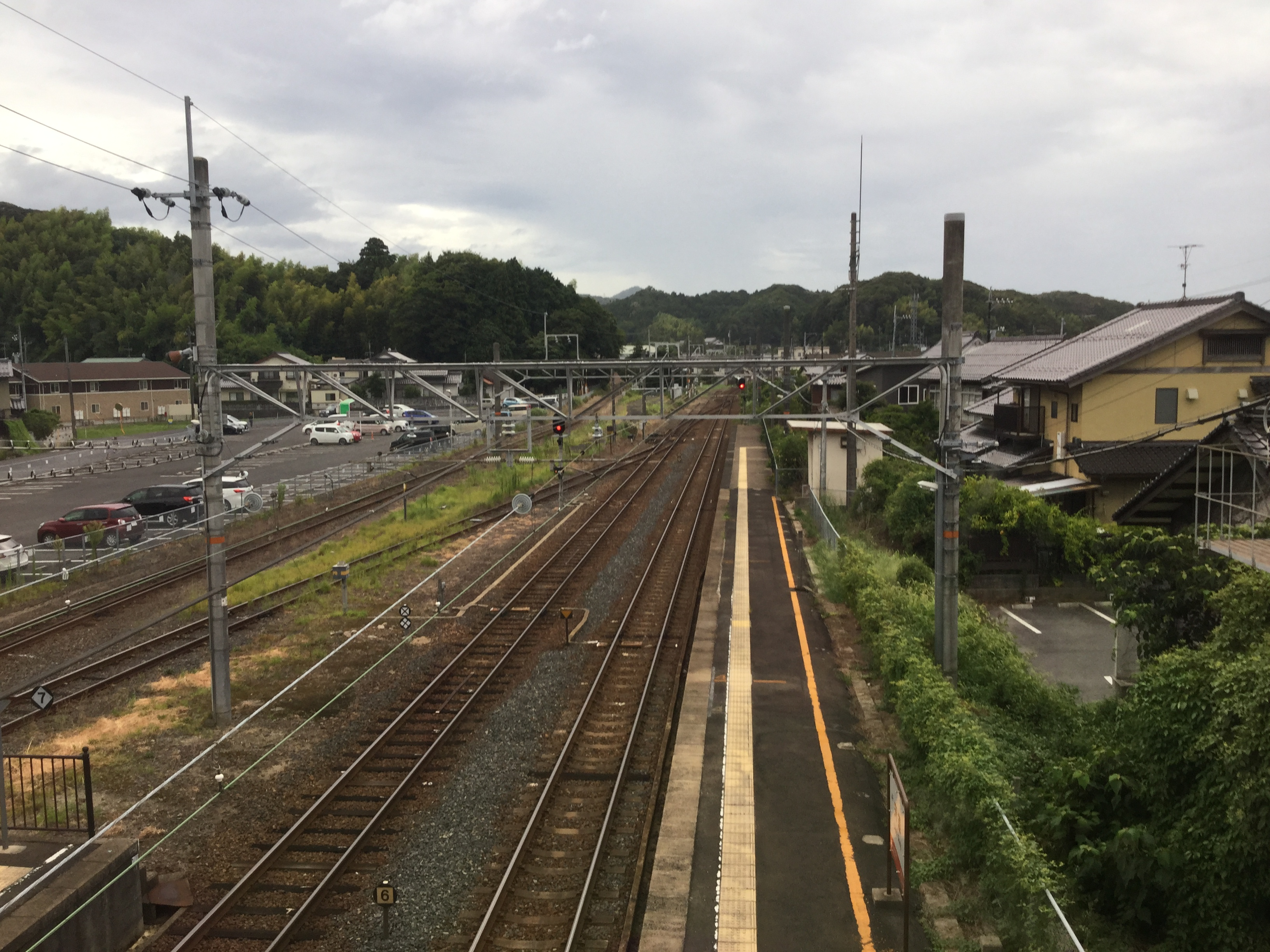
Station platform

Shinji Station (宍道駅, Shinj-eki) is a junction passenger railway station located in the city of Matsue, Shimane Prefecture, Japan. It is operated by the West Japan Railway Company (JR West).

== Lines ==
Shinji Station is served by the JR West San'in Main Line, and is located 368.9 kilometers from the terminus of the line at Kyoto. It is also the terminus of the 81.9 kilometer Kisuki Line to Bingo-Ochiai

== Station layout ==
The station consists of one side platform and one island platform. The station building is adjacent to the side platform and is connected to the island platform by a footbridge. The station building is staffed.

== Platforms ==
1	■ D San'in Main Line	for Matsue, Yonago and Tottori for Izumoshi and Hamada
2	■ D San'in Main Line	for Izumoshi and Hamada
3	■ E Kisuki Line	for Kisuki and Bingo-Ochiai
3	■ D San'in Main Line	for Izumoshi and Hamada for Matsue

== Adjacent stations ==
West Japan Railway Company (JR West)

«	Service	»
Sanin Main Line
Matsue	Sleeper Limited Express Sunrise Izumo	Izumoshi
Tamatsukuri-Onsen	Limited Express Yakumo	Izumoshi
Tamatsukuri-Onsen	West Express Ginga	Izumoshi
Tamatsukuri-Onsen or Matsue	Limited Express Super Oki	Izumoshi
Tamatsukuri-Onsen or Matsue	Limited Express Super Matsukaze	Izumoshi
Matsue	Rapid Commuter Liner	Shobara
Kimachi	Rapid Aqua Liner	Shōbara
Kimachi	Rapid Tottori Liner	Shōbara

== History ==
Shinji Station was opened on 7 November 1909 when the line was extended from Matsue Station on the Japan Government Railways. The line was further extended to Shobara on 6 October 1910. With the privatization of the Japan National Railway (JNR) on 1 April 1987, the station came under the aegis of the West Japan Railway Company (JR West).

== Passenger statistics ==
In fiscal 2020, the station was used by an average of 488 passengers daily.

== Surrounding area ==
- Matsue City Hall Shinji Branch
- Matsue City Shinji Elementary School
- Matsue City Shinji Junior High School
- Shimane Prefectural Shinji High School
- Lake Shinji

== See also ==
- List of railway stations in Japan
