= Bingo-Ochiai Station =

Railway station in Shōbara, Hiroshima Prefecture, Japan

Bingo-Ochiai Station 備後落合駅
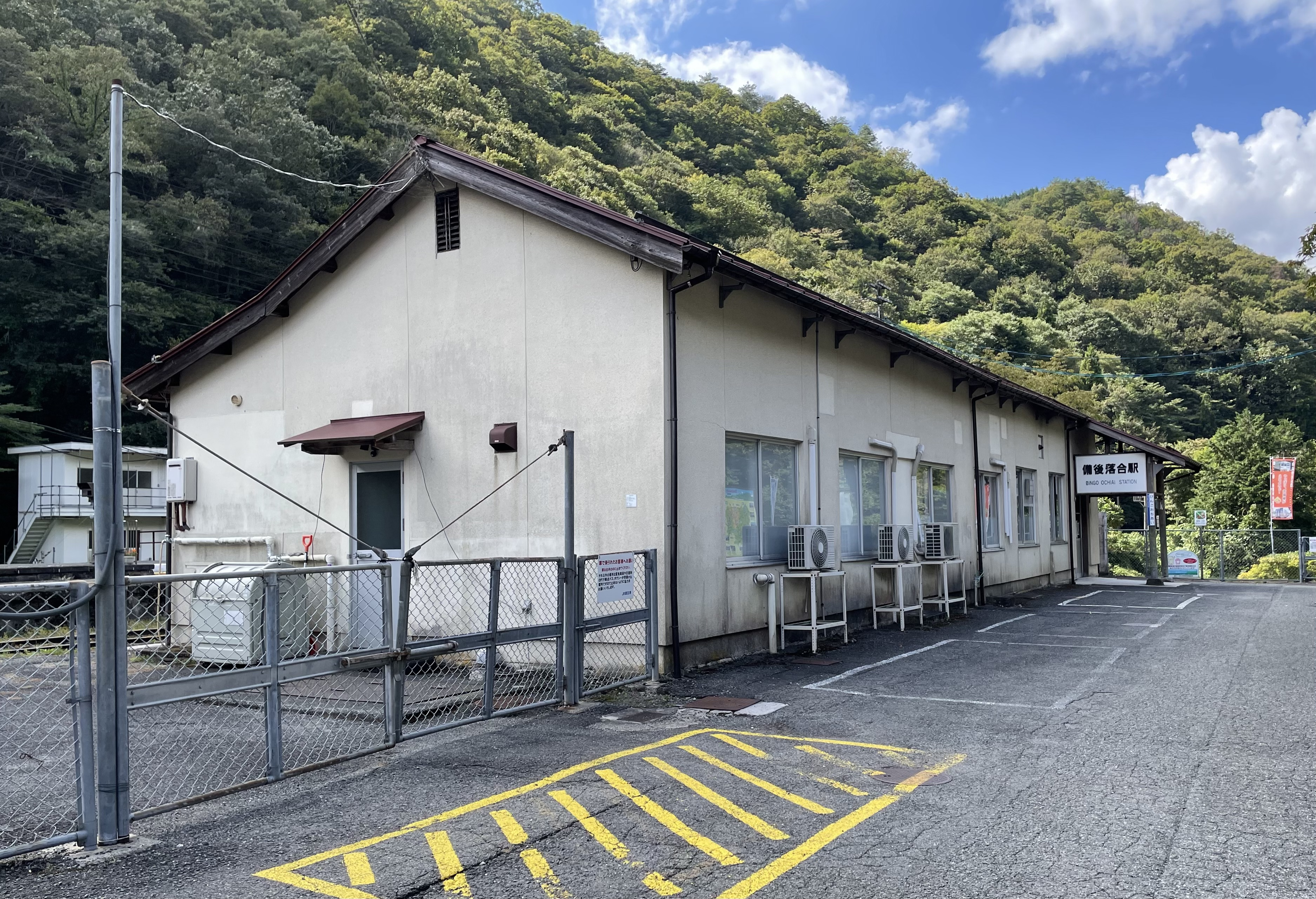
- The station building in September 2024

General information
- Location: 1778 Hattori, Saijō-chō, Shōbara-shi, Hiroshima-ken 729-5721; Japan
- Coordinates: 35°0′4.31″N 133°8′54.15″E
- Operator: JR West
- Line: P Geibi Line E Kisuki Line
- Distance: 44.6 km (27.7 miles) from Bitchū-Kōjiro
- Platforms: 1 side + 1 island platform
- Tracks: 3

Other information
- Status: Unstaffed
- Website: Official website

History
- Opened: 20 December 1935

Passengers
- 2019: 28 daily

Services
Preceding station	JR West	Following station
Hibayama towards Hiroshima	Geibi Line Local	Dōgoyama towards Niimi
Yuki towards Shinji	Kisuki Line Local	Terminus
Location
- Location within Hiroshima Prefecture Location within Japan

Bingo-Ochiai Station (備後落合駅, Bingo-Ochiai-eki) is a interchange passenger railway station located in Saijō-chō, in the city of Shōbara, Hiroshima Prefecture, Japan. It is operated by the West Japan Railway Company (JR West).

== Lines ==
Bingo-Ochiai Station is served by the Geibi Line, and is located 44.6 kilometers from the terminus of the line at Bitchū-Kōjiro and 51.0 kilometers from Niimi. It is also the terminus of the 81.9 kilometer Kisuki Line to Shinji.

== Station layout ==
The station consists of one ground-level side platform and one island platform. The station building is located next to the side platform (used by the Kisuki Line), which is connected to the station's island platform (used by the Geibi Line) via a level crossing. There was a footbridge at the time of opening, but it was removed during the Pacific War. The station is unattended.

=== Platforms ===
1	■ E Kisuki Line	for Izumo-Yokota and Kisuki
2	■ P Geibi Line	for Bingo-Shōbara and Shiomachi
3	■ P Geibi Line	for Tōjō and Niimi

== History ==
Bingo-Ochiai Station was opened on December 20, 1935 as the terminus of the Shōbara Line between Bingo-Saijō and Bingo-Ochiai. Upon completion of the extension of the line from Onuka Station on October 10, 1936 it became an intermediary stop on the Sanshin Line between Bitchū Kōjiro and Miyoshi. The line was nationalized on July 1, 1937 and renamed the Geibi Line. On December 12, 1937 it became a junction station between the Kisuki Line and the Geibi Line. Bingo Ochiai Station served as one of the main stations in the Bihoku district, including lodging facilities, track maintenance divisions, and communication divisions were established, and at one point more than 200 employees worked at the station. The station handled locomotive replacement and maintenance, split-merge of carriages, switchbacks, etc. The station became part of JR West on April 1, 1987 when Japan National Railways was privatized.

== Passenger statistics ==
In fiscal 2019, the station was used by an average of 28 passengers daily.

== Station details ==
The station is located in a mountainous area and is separated from Japan National Route 183, which runs parallel to the station, by the Hitotobara River, a tributary of the Saijō River. It is connected to the national highway by Hiroshima Prefectural Route 234, but the bridge that crosses the Otoriwara River is located about 90 meters to the east, and it slopes gently down toward the bridge. There are no shops in front of the station, and there are many vacant houses due to rural depopulation.

In front of the station were two inns, taxis, restaurants, barbershops and other establishments, such that the area was called "Ochiai Ginza". However, after World War II, the number of employees decreased due to the replacement of steam locomotives with diesel trains, and the number of users decreased due to depopulation and the development of the road network.

== See also ==
- List of railway stations in Japan
