= List of national treasures of Japan (archaeological materials) =

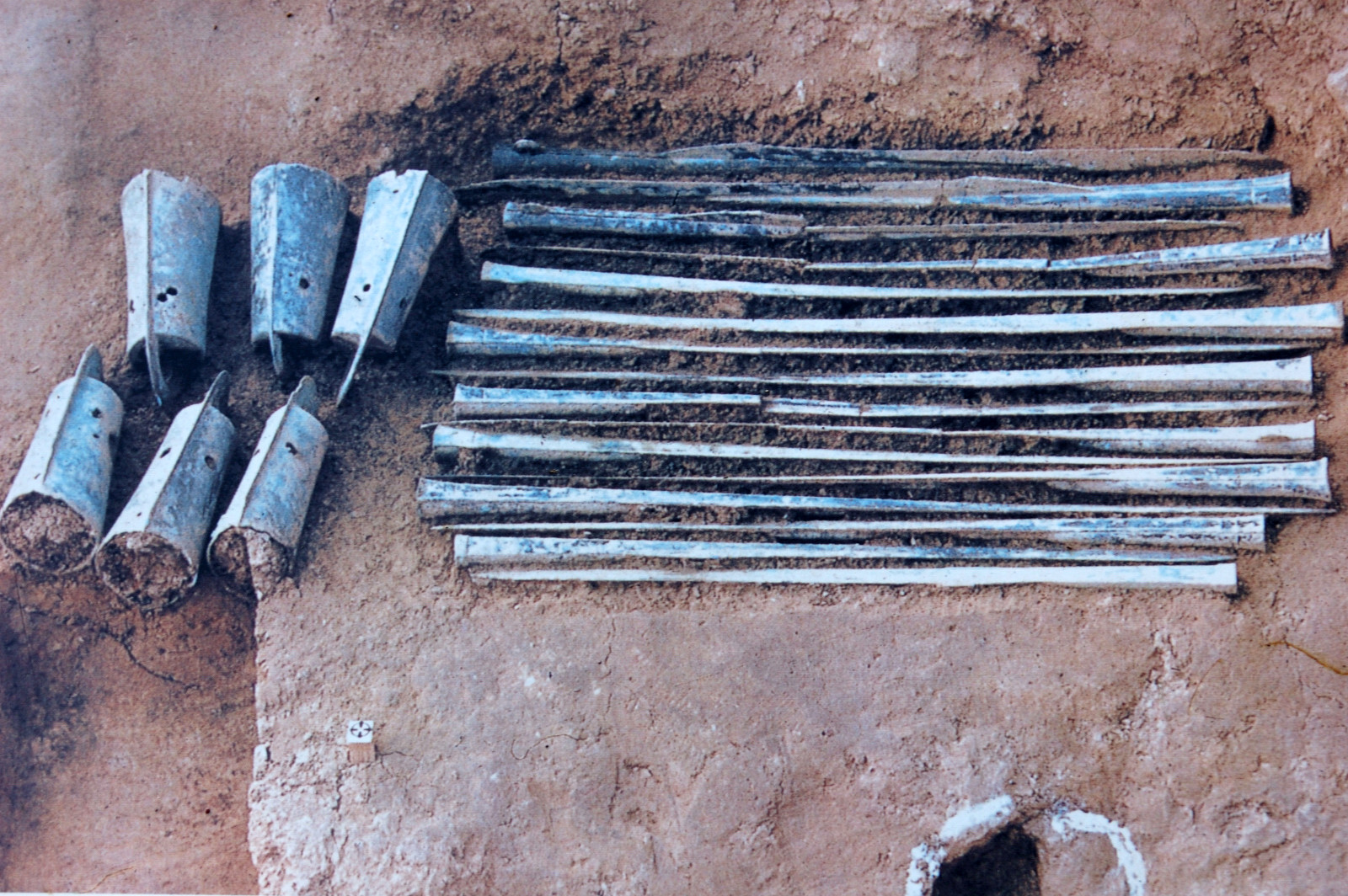
Hoko spears and dōtaku ritual bells excavated at the Kōjindani Site in Hikawa, Shimane

The term "national treasure" has been used in Japan to denote cultural properties since 1897. The definition and the criteria have changed since the introduction of the term. These archaeological materials adhere to the current definition, and have been designated national treasures since the Law for the Protection of Cultural Properties came into effect on June 9, 1951. The items are selected by the Ministry of Education, Culture, Sports, Science and Technology based on their "especially high historical or artistic value". The list presents 52 materials or sets of materials from ancient to feudal Japan, spanning a period from about 4,500 BC to 1361 AD. The actual number of items is more than 52 because groups of related objects have been combined into single entries. Most of the items have been excavated from tombs, kofun, sutra mounds or other archaeological sites. The materials are housed in museums (34), temples (9), shrines (8) and a university (1) in 27 cities of Japan. The Tokyo National Museum houses the greatest number of archaeological national treasures, with 7 of the 52.

The Japanese Paleolithic marks the beginning of human habitation in Japan. It is generally accepted that human settlement did not occur before 38,000 BC, although some sources suggest the date to be as early as 50,000 BC. Archaeological artifacts from the Paleolithic era consist of stone tools of various types, indicative of a hunter-gatherer society. A set of 1965 such tools has been designated as the oldest national treasure. From about 14,000 to 8,000 BC, the society gradually transformed to one characterized by the creation of pottery used for storage, cooking, bone burial and possibly ceremonial purposes. People continued to subsist on hunting, fishing and gathering, but evidence points to a gradual decrease in the nomadic lifestyle. Potsherds of unornamented pottery from the oldest archaeological sites constitute some of the world's oldest pottery. These are followed by linear-relief, punctated and nail-impressed pottery types. The first cord-marked pottery dates to 8,000 BC. Cord-marked pottery required a technique of pressing twisted cords into the clay, or by rolling cord-wrapped sticks across the clay. The Japanese definition for the period of prehistory characterized by the use of pottery is Jōmon (縄文; lit. cord-patterned) and refers to the entire period (c. 10,500 to 300 BC). Pottery techniques reached their apogee during the Middle Jōmon period with the emergence of fire-flame pottery created by sculpting and carving coils of clay applied to vessel rims, resulting in a rugged appearance. A set of 57 items of fire-flame pottery, dating to around 4,500 BC, has been designated as national treasure. Archaeologists consider that such pottery may have had a symbolic meaning or was used ceremonially. Dogū—small clay figurines depicting humans and animals—can be dated to the earliest Jōmon period but their prevalence increased dramatically in the middle Jōmon. Many of these depict women with exaggerated breasts and enlarged buttocks, considered to be a fertility symbol. Five dogū from 3000 to 1000 BC have been designated as national treasures.

The ensuing Yayoi period is characterized by great technological advances such as wet-rice agriculture or bronze and iron casting, which were introduced from the mainland. Iron knives and axes, followed by bronze swords, spears and mirrors, were brought to Japan from Korea and China. Later all of these were produced locally. The primary artistic artifacts, with the exception of Yayoi pottery, are bronze weapons, such as swords, halberds and dōtaku, ritual bells. The bells were often discovered in groups on a hillside buried with the weapons. They are 0.2 to 1.2 m (7.9 in to 3 ft 11.2 in) tall and often decorated with geometric designs such as horizontal bands, flowing water patterns or spirals. A few bells feature the earliest Japanese depiction of people and animals. In addition ornamental jewels were found. The weapons that have been excavated are flat and thin, suggesting a symbolic use. Due to rusting, few iron objects have survived from this period. Burial mounds in square, and later round, enclosures were common in the Yayoi period. The starting date of the Kofun period (c. 250–300 AD) is defined by the appearance of large-scale keyhole-shaped kofun mound tombs, thought to mark imperial burials. Typical burial goods include mirrors, beads, Sue ware, weapons and later horse gear. One of the most well-known tombs, whose content of warrior-related items has been designated as national treasure, is the late 6th century Fujinoki Tomb. Mirrors, swords and curved jewels, which constitute the Imperial Regalia of Japan, appear as early as the middle Yayoi period, and are abundant in Kofun period tombs. Characteristic of most kofun are haniwa clay terra cotta figures whose origin and purpose is unknown. A haniwa of an armoured man has been designated as national treasure; and a 1st-century gold seal, designated a national treasure, shows one of the earliest mentions of Japan or Wa.

Buddhism arrived in Japan in the mid–6th century Asuka period, and was officially adopted in the wake of the Battle of Shigisan in 587, after which Buddhist temples began to be constructed. The new religion and customs fundamentally transformed Japanese society and the arts. Funerary traditions such as cremation and the practice of placing epitaphs in graves were imported from China and Korea. Following the treatment of Buddhist relics, the cremated remains in a glass container were wrapped in a cloth and placed in an outer container. Epitaphs, which recorded the lives of the deceased on silver or bronze rectangular strips, were particularly popular from the latter half of the 7th to the end of the 8th century (late Asuka and Nara period). Five epitaphs and a number of cinerary urns and reliquaries containing bones have been designated as national treasures. Other archaeological national treasures from the Buddhist era include ritual items buried in the temple foundations of the Golden Halls of Tōdai-ji and Kōfuku-ji in Nara. According to an ancient Buddhist prophecy, the world would enter a dark period in 1051; consequently in the late Heian period the belief in the saving powers of Maitreya or Miroku, the Buddha to be, became widespread. Believers buried scriptures and images to gain merit and to prepare for the coming Buddha. This practice, which continued into the Kamakura period, required the transcription of sutras according to strict ritual protocols, their placement in protective reliquary containers and burial in the earth of sacred mountains, shrines or temples to await the future Buddha. The oldest known sutra mound is that of Fujiwara no Michinaga from 1007 on Mount Kinpu, who buried one lotus sutra and five other sutras that he had written in 998. Its sutra container has been designated as national treasure.

== Statistics ==
All of the 52 national treasures are presently located in Japan; two were discovered in China and three were found in Japan, but the exact locations of their excavation sites is unknown. The excavation sites of the remaining 46 treasures are contained in the following table.

Prefecture	City	National treasures	
Prefecture	City	present location	excavation site
Aomori	Hachinohe	1	1
Ehime	Imabari	1	1
Fukuoka	Buzen	1	1
Fukuoka	Fukuoka	1	1
Fukuoka	Fukutsu	2	2
Fukuoka	Itoshima	1	1
Fukuoka	Munakata	1	1
Gunma	Ōta	—	1
Gunma	Takasaki	1	1
Hokkaidō	Hakodate	1	1
Hokkaidō	Engaru	1	1
Hyōgo	Kobe	1	1
Kagawa	unknown	—	1
Kumamoto	Kikusui	—	1
Kyoto	Kyoto	4	3
Mie	Ise	1	1
Mie	Matsusaka	1	1
Miyazaki	Saito	—	1
Nagano	Chino	2	2
Nara	Asuka	—	1
Nara	Haibara	—	1
Nara	Ikaruga	—	1
Nara	Kashiba	—	1
Nara	Kashihara	1	—
Nara	Nara	6	4
Nara	Sakurai	—	1
Nara	Tenkawa	—	2
Nara	Tenri	1	2
Nara	Yoshino	1	—
Niigata	Tōkamachi	1	1
Osaka	Habikino	1	1
Osaka	Kashiwara	—	1
Osaka	Osaka	2	—
Osaka	Takatsuki	—	1
Saitama	Saitama	1	1
Shiga	Ōtsu	1	1
Shimane	Hikawa	—	1
Shimane	Izumo	2	—
Shimane	Unnan	—	1
Tokyo	Tachikawa	1	1
Tokyo	Tokyo	12	—
Tottori	Yurihama	1	1
Yamagata	Funagata	—	1
Yamagata	Yamagata	1	—

Period (Note: Only the oldest period is counted if a national treasure belongs to more than one period.)	National treasures
Upper Paleolithic	1
Jōmon period	6
Yayoi period	6
Warring States period	1
Han dynasty	1
Kofun period	14
Asuka period	3
Nara period	12
Heian period	7
Nanboku-chō period	1

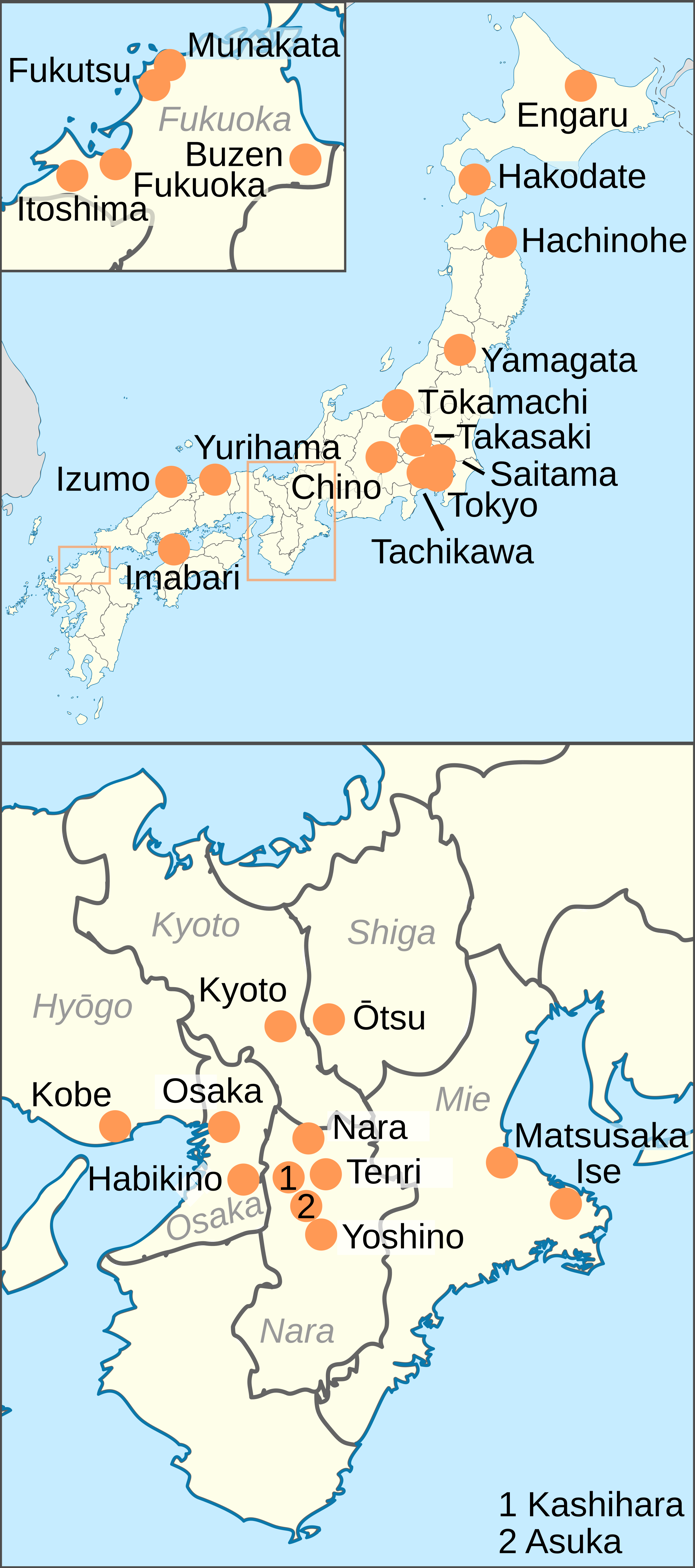
Present location of archaeological national treasures of Japan

== Usage ==
The table's columns (except for Details and Image) are sortable by pressing the arrow symbols.

- Name: name of the national treasure as registered in the Database of National Cultural Properties
- Details: more information about the object such as size and type of items (if the national treasure comprises more than one item)
- Date: period and year of the item; column entries sort by year or start year of a period if only a period is known
- Excavation site: "site-name town-name prefecture-name"; column entries sort as "prefecture-name town-name site-name"
- Present location: "temple/museum/shrine-name town-name prefecture-name"; column entries sort as "prefecture-name town-name temple/museum/shrine-name"
- Image: picture of the national treasure or of the excavation site

== Treasures ==
Name	Details	Date	Excavation site	Present location	Image
Artifacts from the Shirataki sites (北海道白滝遺跡群出土品, hokkaidō shirataki iseki gun shutsudohin)	1965 stone tools from a paleolithic site.	Upper Paleolithic, 13,000–28,000 BC	Shirataki sites, Engaru, Hokkaidō	Engaru Archaeological Center, Engaru, Hokkaidō	—
Hollow clay figure (土偶, dogū)	At 41.5 cm (16.3 in) biggest hollow clay figure in Japan	late Jōmon period, 2,000–1,000 BC	Chobonaino (著保内野) site, Minamikayabe (南茅部町, Minamikayabe-chō) (now Hakodate), Kayabe District, Hokkaidō	Hakodate Jōmon Culture Center, Hakodate, Hokkaidō	
Dogū with palms together (土偶, dogū)	Height: 19.8 cm (7.8 in), width: 14.2 cm (5.6 in), depth: 15.2 cm (6.0 in), remaining traces of red pigment suggest that the whole figure was once painted red	late Jōmon period, 2,000–1,000 BC	Kazahari (風張) 1 site, Hachinohe, Aomori Prefecture. Excavated on June 30, 1997	Korekawa Jōmon Kan, Hachinohe, Aomori Prefecture	Figure seated on the ground with arms resting on the knees and palms together.
Nishinomae Dogū (土偶, dogū)	Height: 45.0 cm (17.7 in), width: 17 cm (6.7 in), weight: 3.155 kg (6.96 lb)	middle Jōmon period, ca. 2,500 BC. Excavated in 1992	Nishinomae (西ノ前), Funagata, Yamagata Prefecture.	Yamagata Prefectural Museum, Yamagata, Yamagata Prefecture	
Artifacts from the Gunma Watanuki Kannonyama Kofun (群馬県綿貫観音山古墳出土品, gunmaken watanuki kannonyama kofun shutsudohin)	Various articles from a burial mound including swords, an iron helmet, a harness, mirrors and personal items.	Kofun period	Watanuki Kannonyama Kofun, Takasaki, Gunma	Gunma Prefectural Museum of History, Takasaki, Gunma Prefecture	
Artifacts from the Saitama Inariyama Kofun (武蔵埼玉稲荷山古墳出土品, Musashi Saitama Inariyama kofun shutsudohin)	Various articles from a burial mound including the Inariyama Sword, a shinju-kyo, a Jade magatama, two silver rings, tools, other weapons and items of armour	Kofun period	Inariyama Kofun, Saitama, Saitama	Saitama Prefectural Museum of the Sakitama Ancient Burial Mounds, Saitama, Saitama	Two joined man-made hills. Rusty sword.
Copper epitaph of Ō no Yasumaro (太安萬侶銅板墓誌, Ō no Yasumaro dōban boshi) (Note: Attached to the nomination are four pearls and fragments of a wooden container.)	Copper epitaph of Ō no Yasumaro proving the existence of the compiler of the kojiki. A 41 character inscription records Yasumaro's place of residence, his rank, name, date of death, and possibly the date of his burial. 29.1 cm × 6.1 cm × 0.1 cm (11.457 in × 2.402 in × 0.039 in)	Nara period, 723	Konose-chō, Nara, Nara Prefecture	Agency for Cultural Affairs, Tokyo	
Objects from the Tōdaijiyama Tumulus (奈良県東大寺山古墳出土品, Nara-ken Tōdaijiyama kofun shutsudohin)	Particularly noted for the Tōdaijiyama Sword, the oldest inscribed artifact in Japan. Other articles in this designation include: 13 kanto (ring-pommel) swords and swords with wooden handles, more than 25 iron swords and lances, 261 arrowheads, a set of leather armor, seven bronze vessels, 62 beads, 45 stone arrowheads, 13 pot-shaped stone vessels, 51 jasper arm ornaments.	Kofun period, 4th century	Tōdaijiyama Kofun, Ichinomoto, Tenri, Nara Prefecture	Tokyo National Museum, Tokyo	
Objects from the Asukaike workshop ruins (奈良県飛鳥池遺跡出土品, naraken asuka-ike iseki shutsudohin)	Particularly noteworthy for the fuhonsen coins and materials used for their production. In addition the designation contains various glass, metal and wooden products.	Asuka period, latter half of 7th century	Asukaike workshop ruins, Asuka, Nara Prefecture	Nara National Research Institute for Cultural Properties, Nara, Nara Prefecture	
Ritual objects used in consecration of the building site of the Golden Hall, Kōfuku-ji (興福寺金堂鎮壇具, Kōfukuji kondō chindangu), designation Nr. 0024	1400 individual items of more than 30 types buried to purify the construction site of the Golden Hall of Kōfuku-ji and to protect the building of catastrophes. The articles are made of The seven treasures (七宝, shippō): gold, silver, pearl, crystal, amber, glass and agate and include bowls, cups, spoons, a pestle, mirrors, swords, knives, rosary and other beads, combs, hexagonal and cylindrical objects, etc.	Tang dynasty or Nara period, c. 710	below foundations of the altar of the Golden Hall, Kōfuku-ji, Nara. Excavated in 1874	Tokyo National Museum, Tokyo	
Hosokawa Mirror (金銀錯狩猟文鏡, kinginsaku shuryō monkyō)	Bronze mirror inlaid with gold and silver in a hunting motif, diameter: 17.5 cm (6.9 in)	Warring States period, 3rd–4th century BC	tomb close to Luoyang, Henan province, China	Eisei Bunko Museum, Tokyo	—
kinsai chōjūunmon dōban (金彩鳥獣雲文銅盤)	Bronze water bowl with a tiger/dragon pattern, diameter: 36.5 cm (14.4 in)	Former Han–Later Han dynasty, around 0	China	Eisei Bunko Museum, Tokyo	—
Gilt bronze cinerary urn of Ina no Omura (金銅威奈大村骨蔵器, kondō Ina no Ōmura kotsuzōki)	Gilt bronze urn for the ashes of Ina no Omura, a descendant of Emperor Senka. The lid bears a 319 character inscription dated November 21, 707, telling about his career to become a feudal lord as well as his death and burial. Height: 24.2 cm (9.5 in), diameter: 23.6 cm (9.3 in)	Asuka period, 707	Kashiba, Nara	Shitennō-ji, Osaka	
Saddle fittings in gilt bronze openwork (金銅透彫鞍金具, kondō sukashibori kura kanagu) (Note: Attached to the nomination are one gilt bronze bit panel, gilt bronze strap buckles with floral design, a sword sheath of deer horn, remains of a harness, of iron arrowheads, of armour, etc together with the documents related to the excavation.)	Two gilt bronze saddle fittings, width: 43 cm (pommel), 52.5 cm (cantle)	Kofun period, 5th century	Ojin Mausoleum (kofun of Emperor Ōjin) in Habikino, Minamikawachi District, Osaka	Konda-Hachimangu, Habikino, Osaka	
Ritual Bell with Crossed Band Design (袈裟襷文銅鐸, kesadasukimon dōtaku)	Bronze ritual bell (Dōtaku) with tooth-, spiral- and herringbone-patterned bands in relief and six panels framed by broad lattice-patterned bands resembling a Buddhist monk's surplice. The panels are decorated with animal and human motifs. Height: 43.0 cm (16.9 in)	Yayoi period, 2nd–1st century BC	Purportedly Sanuki Province (Kagawa Prefecture), excavated during the Edo period	Tokyo National Museum, Tokyo	
Haniwa armored man (埴輪武装男子立像, haniwa busō danshi ritsuzō) or Warrior in keikō type armor	Terra cotta Haniwa (burial figure of an armored man with a sword, a bow, and a quiver of arrows, height: 131.5 cm (51.8 in)	late Kofun period, 6th century	former Kuai (九合村, Kuai-mura) (now Ōta), Nitta District, Gunma	Tokyo National Museum, Tokyo	Terracotta figure of a man in armour.
Suda Hachiman Shrine mirror (人物画象鏡, jinbutsuga zōkyō) or Mirror with design of human figures	Bronze mirror with human figures and an inscription of 48 characters on the back: In the eighth month of a gui-wei year, in the reign of the great king ..., when his younger brother the prince was at the Osisaka Palace, Sima, wishing for longevity [of the king], caused two persons ..., to select 200 han of fine bronze and make this mirror., diameter: 19.8 cm (7.8 in)	Kofun period, 443 or 503	Japan, exact date and place unknown	Tokyo National Museum, Tokyo, owned by Suda-Hachiman Shrine (隅田八幡神社, Suda Hachiman Jinja), Hashimoto, Wakayama	A round object with an inscription in Chinese characters around the outer part and figurative relief in the middle.
Stone pillar (石幢, sekidō)	Hexagonal schist stone column with reliefs of the Four Heavenly Kings and Nio guardians, made of six plank stones of 10 cm (3.9 in) thickness and a conical headstone, height: 166 cm (65 in), width: 42 cm (17 in)	Nanboku-chō period, July 1361	until Meiji period located on the cemetery behind the compound grounds of Fusai-ji; moved to its present location in 1889	Fusai-ji (普済寺), Tachikawa, Tokyo	Stone column with reliefs of deities.
Urns found at Miyajidake Shrine, Chikuzen Province (筑前国宮地獄神社境内出土骨 蔵器, Chikuzen no kuni Miyajidake Jinja keidai shutsudo kotsuzōki) (Note: Attached to the nomination are remains of a bowl or pot.)	Clay pot, copper vase (19.5 cm (7.7 in)) and glass vase (11.2 cm (4.4 in)) which were used as urns	Nara period	near Miyajidake Kofun (宮地嶽古墳), Fukutsu, Fukuoka, excavated in 1938	Miyajidake Shrine, Fukutsu, Fukuoka	—
Copper epitaph of Funashi Ōgo (銅製船氏王後墓誌, dōsei Funashi Ōgo no boshi)	Copper epitaph of Funashi Ōgo (船氏王後) who died in 641 and was reburied with his wife in 668. The inscription of 162 characters tells on one side about his birthplace and career and on the opposite about his age at death and the burial details. This is the oldest extant Japanese epitaph. 29.7 cm × 6.8 cm (11.7 in × 2.7 in)	Asuka period, 668	Shōkōzan (松岡山), Kashiwara, Osaka	Mitsui Memorial Museum, Tokyo	
Gilt bronze harness from the Saitobaru kofun in Hyūga Province (日向国西都原古墳出土金銅馬具類, Hyūga no kuni Saitobaru kofun shutsudo kondō bagurui)	Horse ornament with openwork decorations, gilt bronze trapping	Kofun period, 6th century	excavated from a tomb at Saitobaru, Saito, Miyazaki	Gotoh Museum, Tokyo	A small hillock with an entrance.
Objects from the Eta Funayama Kofun in Higo Province (肥後江田船山古墳出土品, Higo Eta Funayama kofun shutsudohin)	Swords (one with an inscription inlaid in silver: Eta Funayama Sword), armor, weapons, a gilt-bronze headdress and a pair of gilt-bronze shoes, gold earrings, jewels and other ornaments, six bronze mirrors, horse trappings, and ceramic utensils excavated from a stone burial chamber	Kofun period, late 5th–early 6th century	Eta Funayama Kofun, Nagomi, Tamana District, Kumamoto. Excavated in 1873	Tokyo National Museum, Tokyo	Detail of a metal object showing embossed scene of a horse-drawn chariot.
Objects from the grave of Fumi no Nemaro (文祢麻呂墓出土品, Fumi no Nemaro bo shutsudohin)	Bronze epitaph plaque (26.2 cm (10.3 in) long) and box (4.8 cm (1.9 in) high), gilt bronze outer container (26.7 cm (10.5 in) high), funerary urn of green glass (17.8 cm (7.0 in) high)	Nara period, 707	Yataki (八滝), Haibara, Nara	Tokyo National Museum, Tokyo	
Blaze-shaped pottery from the Sasayama site in Niigata prefecture (新潟県笹山遺跡出土深鉢形土器, Niigata-ken Sasayama iseki shutsudo fukabachigata doki) (Note: Attached to the nomination is one earthenware, one stone implement and one iron oxide clod.)	57 items of flame-shaped pottery for ceremonial use, probably the world's oldest pottery	Jōmon period, ca. 4,500 BC	Sasayama (笹山), Tōkamachi, Niigata	Tōkamachi City Museum, Tōkamachi, Niigata	Vessel with flame-shaped ornamentation on the rim.
Jōmon Venus (土偶, dogū)	Female figurine with large hips, elephant-like legs, small belly and breasts wearing a helmet or headdress; height: 27 cm (11 in), weight: 2.14 kg (4.7 lb)	middle Jōmon period, 3,000–2,000 BC	Tanabatake (棚畑) site, Yonezawa (米沢), Chino, Nagano	Togariishi Museum of Jōmon Archaeology, Chino, Nagano	
Masked Goddess (土偶, dogū) (Note: Attached to the nomination are eight items of earthenware.)	Clay figurine with a mask unusually excavated from a burial pit; height: 34 cm (13 in), weight: 2.7 kg (6.0 lb)	late Jōmon period, 2,000–1,000 BC	Nakappara Site, Chino, Nagano	Togariishi Museum of Jōmon Archaeology, Chino, Nagano	
Artifacts from the Kyōgamine sutra mounds at Mount Asama in Ise province (伊勢国朝熊山経ケ峯経塚出 土品, Ise no kuni Asama-yama Kyōgamine kyōzuka shutsudohin)	Various articles including: two mirrors incised with the Amida triad, one mirror incised with Amitābha nyorai, remains of a bronze mirror, a bronze decanter, an earthenware canister, two bronze sutra cylinders, lotus sutra	Heian period, 1159–1173	Kyōgamine (経ケ峯) sutra mound, Mount Asama (朝熊山, Asama-yama), Ise, Mie	Kongōshō-ji, Ise, Mie	—
Haniwa from the Takarazuka Kofun No. 1 (三重県宝塚一号墳出土埴輪, mie-ken takarazuka-ichi gōfun shutsudo haniwa)	271 artifacts from the Takarazuka kofun including model houses surrounded by walls and a 140 cm (55 in) long and 94 cm (37 in) high ship in excellent condition.	Kofun period	Takarazuka Kofun No. 1, Matsusaka, Mie	Matsusaka City Cultural Asset Center "Haniwa Museum", Matsusaka, Mie	
Reliquary set from the Sūfuku-ji temple pagoda (崇福寺塔心礎納置品, Sūfukuji tō shinsonōchihin)	Reliquary set consisting of a spherical vase (height: 3 cm (1.2 in), aperture: 1.7 cm (0.67 in)) with gold lid enshrining bones placed in a gold box (6 cm × 4.2 cm (2.4 in × 1.7 in)) surrounded by a silver box (7.9 cm × 5.8 cm (3.1 in × 2.3 in)) surrounded by a gilt bronze box (10.6 cm × 7.9 cm (4.2 in × 3.1 in)). Other items unearthed include 11 Mumon Ginsen (無文銀銭) silver coins (diameter ca. 3 cm (1.2 in)), three green glass beads (diameter 0.6–0.7 cm (0.24–0.28 in)), two amethyst beads (diameter 0.5 cm (0.20 in) and 0.7 cm (0.28 in)), 11 translucent green glass beads (diameter 0.2 cm (0.079 in)), gold leaf and grain, metal fixtures, a fragment of a bell, wood splinter	Nara period	pagoda of Sūfuku-ji (崇福寺), Ōtsu, Shiga	Ōmi Shrine, Ōtsu, Shiga	
Relics from the Kurama-dera sutra mound (鞍馬寺経塚遺物, Kurama-dera kyōzuka ibutsu)	More than 200 objects from a sutra mound among others: two-storied towers (宝塔, hōtō) of stone, iron and bronze, a decorative Buddhist banner-shaped bronze sutra container, sutra containers of bronze, gold and clay, three statues of noble characters, remains of a kakebotoke (懸仏), an image of Buddha, three mirrors, remains of a bronze mirror, a pestle, a bronze water jug, a porcelain box, two inkstones and copper coins	Heian period–Kamakura period, 1120–1260	sutra mound behind the kon-dō (main hall) of Kurama-dera, Kyoto. Excavated in 1878	Kurama-dera, Kyoto	—
Bronze epitaph plate for Ono no Emishi (金銅小野毛人墓誌, kondō Ono no Emishi boshi) (Note: Attached to the nomination are one copper box with an inscription from November 1673 and a document related to the excavation.)	Bronze epitaph of Ono no Emishi (58.9 cm × 5.8 cm × 0.4 cm) with an inscription on both sides. Ono no Emishi was the son of Ono no Imoko and government official under Emperor Temmu. He died in 677. This memorial tablet was made some time after his death.	Nara period, first half of 8th century	grave in Kamitakano (上高野), Sakyō-ku, Kyoto. Discovered in 1613, returned to the grave and taken out for safekeeping in 1914	Sudō Shrine (崇道神社, Sudō Jinja), Kyoto	
Gilt bronze Fujiwara no Michinaga sutra container (金銅藤原道長経筒, kondō Fujiwara Michinaga kyōzutsu)	Cylindrical gilt bronze sutra container of Fujiwara no Michinaga which he buried in a sutra mound during a pilgrimage on Mount Kinpu (now Sanjogatake in Tenkawa, Nara); Height: 36 cm (14 in), diameter at base: 16.1 cm (6.3 in), thickness: 0.3 cm (0.12 in))	Heian period, August 11, 1007	Mount Kinpu (金峯山, Kinpusen), Tenkawa, Nara; excavated in 1671	Kyoto National Museum, Kyoto; owned by Kinmpu Shrine, Yoshino, Nara	
Artifacts from the Nishinoyama Yamashina Kofun (山科西野山古墳出土品, Yamashina Nishinoyama kofun shutsudohin)	Burial accessories from the tomb of an aristocrat including: a sword, knife, arrowheads, nail, belt	Kofun period	Nishinoyama (西野山), Yamashina-ku, Kyoto, Kyoto	Kyoto University, Kyoto	—
Artifacts from the Kinpusen sutra mound (大和国金峯山経塚出土品, Yamato no kuni Kinpusen kyōzuka shutsudohin) (Note: Fragments of the lotus and Samantabhadra sutra on dark blue paper with gilt letters (seven and two pages) and two sutra shafts are attached to the nomination.)	A gold- and silver-plated bronze sutra case with design of birds and hosoge flowers, two bronze sutra cases buried by Fujiwara no Michinaga in a sutra mound during a pilgrimage on Mount Kinpu	Heian period, 1007	Mount Kinpu (金峯山, Kinpusen), Tenkawa, Nara	Kinpusen-ji, Yoshino, Nara	
Bronze epitaph of Ishikawa no Toshitari (金銅石川年足墓誌, kondō Ishikawa no Toshitari boshi) (Note: A wooden chest is attached to the nomination.)	Bronze epitaph of the aristocrat Toshitari Ishikawa (29.6 cm × 10.3 cm × 0.3 cm) with a six line, 130 character inscription and gold plating	Nara period, December 28, 762	Tsukimi (月見町, tsukimi-chō), Takatsuki, Osaka, Osaka	Osaka Museum of History, Osaka, privately owned	
Artifacts from Sakuragaoka: Ritual bells with crossed bands design (袈裟襷文銅鐸, kesadasukimon dōtaku), Ritual bell (銅鐸, dōtaku), Ritual Bell with running water design (流水文銅鐸, ryūsuimon dōtaku), Bronze dagger-axes (銅戈, dōka)	Ten dōtaku with crossed band design, one other dōtaku, three dōtaku with running water design and seven bronze dagger-axes	Yayoi period	Sakuragaoka-chō (桜ヶ丘町), Nada-ku, Kobe, Hyōgo; excavated in December 1964	Kobe City Museum, Kobe, Hyōgo	
Ritual objects used in consecration of the building site of the Golden Hall, Kōfuku-ji (興福寺金堂鎮壇具, Kōfukuji kondō chindangu), designation Nr. 0025	Two small silver gilded bowl, fragment of a silver gilded stem cup, seven small silver bowls, five rosary crystal beads, six other crystal beads	Nara period, 710	within foundations of the altar of the Golden Hall, Kōfuku-ji, Nara. Excavated in 1884	Kōfuku-ji, Nara, Nara	—
Seven-Branched Sword (七支刀, nanatsusaya no tachi, shichishitō)	74.9 cm (29.5 in) long iron sword with six branch-like protrusions along the central blade and an inscription; probably made in Korea	Kofun period, 369	in Isonokami Shrine, Tenri, Nara since ancient times	Isonokami Shrine, Tenri, Nara	Sword with six branch-like protrusions.
Bowl-shaped cap for the finial of the three-storied pagoda of Ōbaradera (大和国粟原寺三重塔伏鉢, Yamato no kuni Ōbaradera sanjū no tō fukubachi)	Copper pagoda finial cap with an inscription, diameter: 49 cm (19 in) (at top), 76.4 cm (30.1 in) (at bottom), height: 35.2 cm (13.9 in)	Nara period, 715	originally at Ōbara-dera, Sakurai, Nara	Nara National Museum, Nara, owned by Tanzan Shrine, Sakurai, Nara	—
Ritual objects used in consecration of the building site of the Golden Hall, Tōdai-ji (東大寺金堂鎭壇具, Tōdaiji kondō chindangu)	Small gilt silver bowl with a hunting motif, swords, armor, a mirror, a fragment of a lacquer box, a crystal box, crystal objects, amber beads, glass beads and 22 crystal beads	Nara period, c. 750	Kondō, Tōdai-ji, Nara, Nara	Tōdai-ji, Nara, Nara	
Artifacts from the Nara Fujinoki kofun (奈良県藤ノ木古墳出土品, Nara-ken Fujinoki kofun shutsudohin)	Various articles from a 6th-century tomb generally of Chinese appearance including a gilt bronze saddle with elephant and phoenix motifs, four bronze mirrors, earthen ware and Sue ware, metal objects and glass articles	Kofun period, latter half of 6th century	Fujinoki Tomb, Ikaruga, Nara; excavated in 1985	The Museum, Archaeological Institute of Kashihara, Kashihara, Nara	A small hillock covered with grass.
Stone with the imprint of Buddha's feet (仏足石, bussoku seki)	Buddha footprint on stone with circles of truth (horin) engraved in the feet; Japan's oldest Buddha footprint	Nara period, July 27, 753	Japan, exact place unknown	Yakushi-ji, Nara, Nara	
Verses tablet (仏足跡歌碑, bussoku seki kahi) or Yakushi-ji Poems	Tablet with 21 verses in the Tanka style praising the Stone with the imprint of Buddha's feet, written in the man'yōgana writing system	Nara period, c. 750	Japan, exact place unknown	Yakushi-ji, Nara, Nara	Rubbing of an inscription in Chinese characters.
Artifacts from the Shitori sutra mound (伯耆一宮経塚出土品, Hōki no ichinomiya kyōzuka shutsudohin)	Various items from a sutra mound including a statue of Kannon Bodhisattva, a statue of the thousand-armed Goddess of Mercy (千手観音), a copper sheet with an engraving of Maitreya Bodhisattva, two bronze mirrors, a bronze sutra container, fragments of a hiōgi (檜扇) folding fans, remains of short swords and knives, glass beads, two copper coins and remains of lacquer ware	Heian period, 1103	Shitori Shrine, Yurihama, Tottori	Shitori Shrine, Yurihama, Tottori	
Bronze bells from the Kamo-Iwakura site (島根県加茂岩倉遺跡出土銅鐸, Shimane-ken Kamo-Iwakura iseki shutsudo dōtaku)	39 dōtaku ritual bells; largest number excavated from a single site in Japan	middle Yayoi period	Kamo-Iwakura Site, Unnan, Shimane. Found in 1996	Shimane Museum of Ancient Izumo, Izumo, Shimane	Bronze bells scattered on the ground.
Bronze implements from the Kojindani site (島根県荒神谷遺跡出土品, Shimane-ken Kōjindani iseki shutsudohin)	358 bronze swords (more than the number of excavated swords in all of the rest of Japan), 16 bronze hoko (銅矛) (spears), six dōtaku ritual bells; length of swords: 50–53 cm (20–21 in)	Yayoi period	Kōjindani Site, Hikawa, Shimane. Excavated in 1984–1985	Shimane Museum of Ancient Izumo, Izumo, Shimane	
Artifacts from the Narabara sutra mound (伊予国奈良原山経塚出土品, Iyo no kuni Narabara-san kyōzuka shutsudohin)	Artifacts from the Narabara sutra mound including a bronze sutra container of pagoda shape (height: 71.5 cm (28.1 in), diameter of body: 17.3 cm (6.8 in)), a bronze sutra container, five bronze mirrors, two hiōgi (檜扇) folding fans, two porcelain boxes, a bronze hairpin, small knives, five bronze bells, an iron bell, a temple gong, copper coins, remains of a jar and an earthenware soup bowl	Heian period, 12th century	Mount Narabara (奈良原山, 楢原山, tamagawa kindai bijutsukan), Imabari, Ehime	Tamagawa Museum of Modern Art, Imabari, Imabari, Ehime. owner: Narabara Shrine (奈良原神社, Narabara Jinja)	—
Artifacts from the Miyajidake Kofun (宮地嶽古墳出土品, Miyajidake kofun shutsudohin) (Note: Various types of metal fittings are attached to the nomination.)	Various articles from a 6th-century kofun including horse ornaments, a crown, remains of two long swords, bronze mirrors, a gold ring, bronze chains, bronze bowls	Kofun period, 6th century	Miyajidake Kofun (宮地嶽古墳), Fukutsu, Fukuoka	Miyajidake Shrine, Fukutsu, Fukuoka.	Square gold seal with Chinese characters
Gold seal (金印, kinin)	Gold seal of the King of the Na state of the Wa (vassal) of Han Dynasty (漢委奴國王, Kan no Wa no Na no Kokuō); 2.35 cm (0.93 in) square, height: 2.25 cm (0.89 in), weight: 109 g (3.8 oz); said to be the seal granted by Emperor Guangwu of Han in 57 AD as mentioned in the Book of the Later Han	Yayoi period, 1st century	southern tip of Shikanoshima, Fukuoka, Fukuoka. Found on April 12, 1784	Fukuoka City Museum, Fukuoka, Fukuoka.	Square gold seal with Chinese characters White Chinese characters on a red square background. =Square gold seal with Chinese characters
Copper plate sutras (銅板法華経, dōban hokekyō) and Copper container (銅筥, dōbako) (Note: A document related to the excavation is attached to the nomination.)	33 copper plates (21.2 cm × 18.2 cm × 0.3 cm) with engraved sūtras and cast bronze container (height: 22.5 cm, 21.4 cm × 18.3 cm at base) engraved with Buddha statues on all four sides, plated with gold at the four corners	Heian period, September 24, 1142 (plates) and October 21, 1142 (box) according to inscriptions	Mount Kubote, Buzen, Fukuoka	Kubote Historical Museum, Buzen, Fukuoka	—
Artifacts from the Okitsumiya ritual site of Munakata-taisha (福岡県宗像大社沖津宮祭祀遺 跡出土品, Fukuoka-ken Munakata-taisha Okitsumiya saishi iseki shutsudohin) and (伝福岡県宗像大社沖津宮祭 祀遺跡出土品)	Huge number of artifacts including a golden loom (金銅高機, kin-sei takabata), a harness pendant in the shape of a heart leaf, mirrors, bracelets, beads, Haji ware pot, Sue ware vessel stand, a bronze incense burner, magatama, a gold ring, a gilt-bronze miniature of five-stringed zither, a gilt-bronze miniature floor loom, etc.	Kofun period–Heian period; the golden loom dates to the Asuka period, 6th–7th century; gilt-bronze loom, pot, vessel stand and miniature zither date to the Nara period, 8th century	Okinoshima, Munakata, Fukuoka	Munakata Taisha, Munakata, Fukuoka	
Artifacts from the Hirabaru square-shaped moated burial precinct (福岡県平原方形周溝墓出土品, Fukuoka-ken Hirabaru hōkei shūkōbo shutsudohin) (Note: Attached to the nomination are earthenware fragments, small glass beads and an iron arrowhead.)	40 bronze mirrors, an iron sword with a ring pommel and many beads of various type. Among the bronze mirrors are the largest specimen of their kind with a diameter of 46.5 cm (18.3 in)	Yayoi period–Kofun period	Hirabaru Site (平原遺跡, Hirabaru iseki), Maebaru, Fukuoka; excavated in 1965	Itokoku History Museum, Itoshima, Fukuoka	—

== See also ==
- Nara Research Institute for Cultural Properties
- Tokyo Research Institute for Cultural Properties
- Independent Administrative Institution National Museum

== Bibliography ==
- Adolphson, Mikael S.; Kamens, Edward; Matsumoto, Stacie (2007). Heian Japan, centers and peripheries (illustrated ed.). University of Hawaii Press. ISBN 978-0-8248-3013-7. Archived from the original on May 6, 2021.
- Bhattacharyya, Asoke Kumar (2004). Early and Buddhist stone sculpture of Japan (illustrated ed.). Abhinav Publications. ISBN 81-7017-422-8. Archived from the original on October 22, 2020.
- Cremin, Aedeen (2007). Archaeologica: The World's Most Significant Sites and Cultural Treasures (illustrated ed.). frances lincoln ltd. ISBN 978-0-7112-2822-1.
- Farris, William Wayne (1998). Sacred texts and buried treasures: issues in the historical archaeology of ancient Japan (illustrated ed.). University of Hawaii Press. ISBN 0-8248-2030-4. Archived from the original on July 10, 2014.
- Frédéric, Louis (2005). Japan encyclopedia (illustrated ed.). Harvard University Press. ISBN 0-674-01753-6. Archived from the original on November 21, 2016.
- Habu, Junko (2004). Ancient Jomon of Japan. Case studies in early societies. Vol. 4 (illustrated ed.). Cambridge University Press. ISBN 0-521-77670-8. Archived from the original on May 2, 2016.
- Kipfer, Barbara Ann (2000). Encyclopedic dictionary of archaeology (illustrated ed.). Springer. ISBN 0-306-46158-7. Archived from the original on May 10, 2016.
- Kleiner, Fred S. (2008). Gardner's Art Through the Ages: A Global History (13th illustrated ed.). Cengage Learning. ISBN 978-0-495-09307-7. Archived from the original on May 10, 2021.
- Kornicki, Peter Francis (1998). The book in Japan: a cultural history from the beginnings to the nineteenth century. Handbuch der Orientalistik. Funfte Abteilung, Japan, 7 (illustrated ed.). BRILL. ISBN 90-04-10195-0.
- Mizoguchi, Kōji (2002). An archaeological history of Japan: 30,000 B.C. to A.D. 700 (illustrated ed.). University of Pennsylvania Press. ISBN 0-8122-3651-3. Archived from the original on June 24, 2020.
- Mason, R. H. P.; Caiger, J. G. (1997). A history of Japan (2nd revised and illustrated ed.). Tuttle Publishing. ISBN 0-8048-2097-X. Archived from the original on May 5, 2021.
- Nishikawa, Kyōtarō; Sano, Emily J. (1983). The great age of Japanese Buddhist sculpture, AD 600–1300 (illustrated ed.). Kimbell Art Museum. ISBN 0-912804-07-6. Archived from the original on May 6, 2021.
- Noma, Seiroku (2003). The Arts of Japan: Ancient and medieval. Vol. 1 (illustrated ed.). Kodansha International. ISBN 4-7700-2977-2. Archived from the original on January 31, 2017.
- Sansom, George; Sansom, Sir George Bailey (1958). A History of Japan to 1334. A History of Japan, Sir George Bailey Sansom, Stanford studies in the civilizations of eastern Asia. Vol. 1 (illustrated ed.). Stanford University Press. ISBN 0-8047-0523-2. Archived from the original on May 3, 2016.
- Shiveley, Donald H.; McCullough, William H.; Hall, John Whitney (1993). The Cambridge history of Japan: Ancient Japan. Vol. 1. Cambridge University Press. ISBN 0-521-22352-0. Archived from the original on May 5, 2021.
