= Eta Funayama Kofun =

Burial mound in Japan

Coordinates: 32°58′16.63″N 130°36′0.02″E

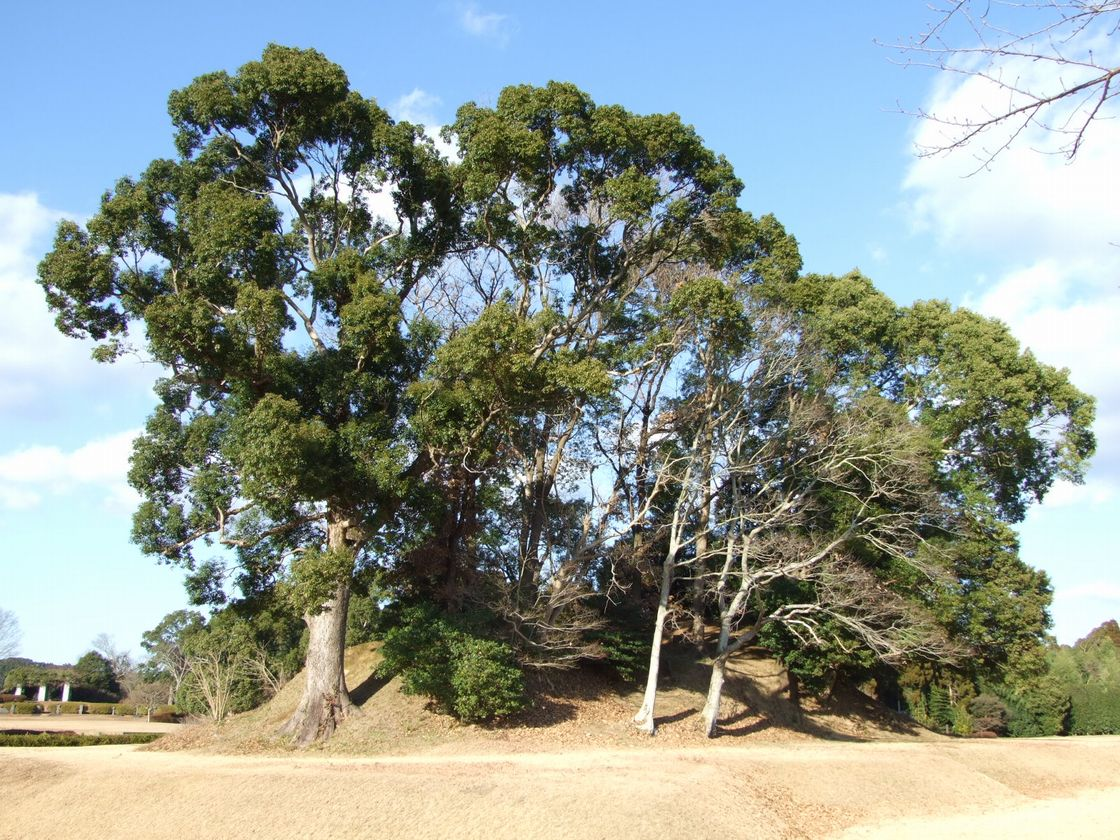
Eta Funayama Kofun

Eta Funayama Kofun (Japanese: 江田船山古墳) is a kofun, or burial mound, located in Nagomi, Kumamoto in Japan. The mound was designated a National Historic Site of Japan in 1951. The designation includes Tsukabōzu Kofun (塚坊主古墳) and Kokuzōtsuka Kofun (虚空蔵塚古墳). Several artifacts excavated from the mound have been designated National Treasures of Japan are now at the Tokyo National Museum (see List of National Treasures of Japan). The style of the bronze items resemble artifacts from the Korean kingdom of Baekje, which had many exchanges with Japan at the time.

== Eta Funayama Sword ==
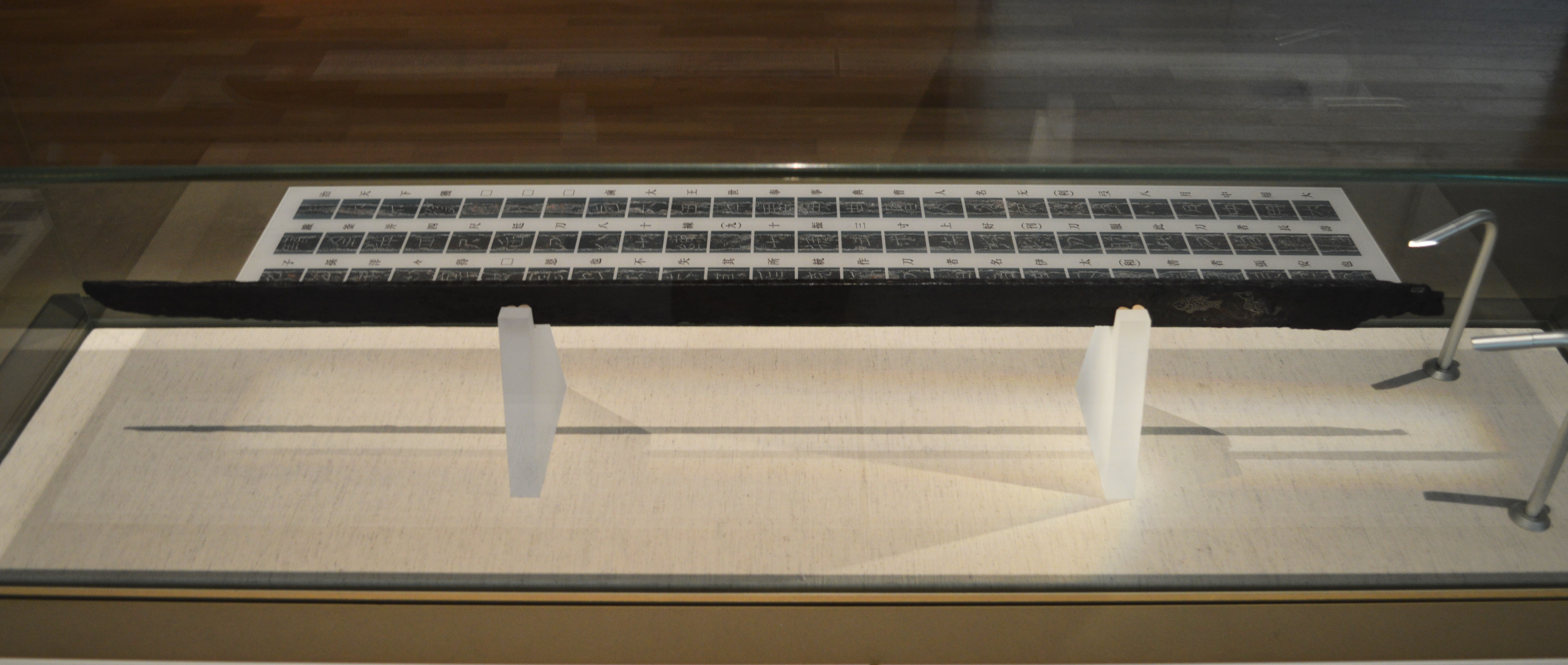
The Eta Funayama Sword, made of iron with inlaid silver inscription

The Eta Funayama Burial Mound Sword (江田船山古墳鉄剣, eta funayama kofun tekken) is a 5th-century ancient iron sword excavated from the mound in 1873. The inscription on the blade indicates that the sword was made during the era of Emperor Yūryaku in the 5th century. This sword, along with other items from the mound, have been designated National Treasures of Japan in the category archaeological materials.

=== Inscription ===
The original inscription and translation is as follows:

治天下獲□□□鹵大王，奉□典曹人名无□弖，八月中，用大錡釜併四尺廷刀八十練□十捃□寸上□□刀。服此刀者□□子孫注ゝ得其恩也，不失其所統。作刀者名伊太加，書者張安也。

In the reign of the great ruler Wa[kataki]ru who ruled the land, in the eighth month an official in service by the name of Mu...te used a large cauldron and a four-foot court [?] sword. Refining and selecting the metal many times,... sword. He who wears this sword...; his descendants will successively obtain its favours, and not lose that which they control. The name of the person who made the sword is Itaka; the text was written by Chōan.

Portions of the text are now illegible (rendered above as □ in the Japanese inscription, or ellipses in the English translation), making it difficult to interpret. The name of the ruler, Wakatakiru, is reconstructed from evidence on the Inariyama burial mound sword.

== Excavated items ==
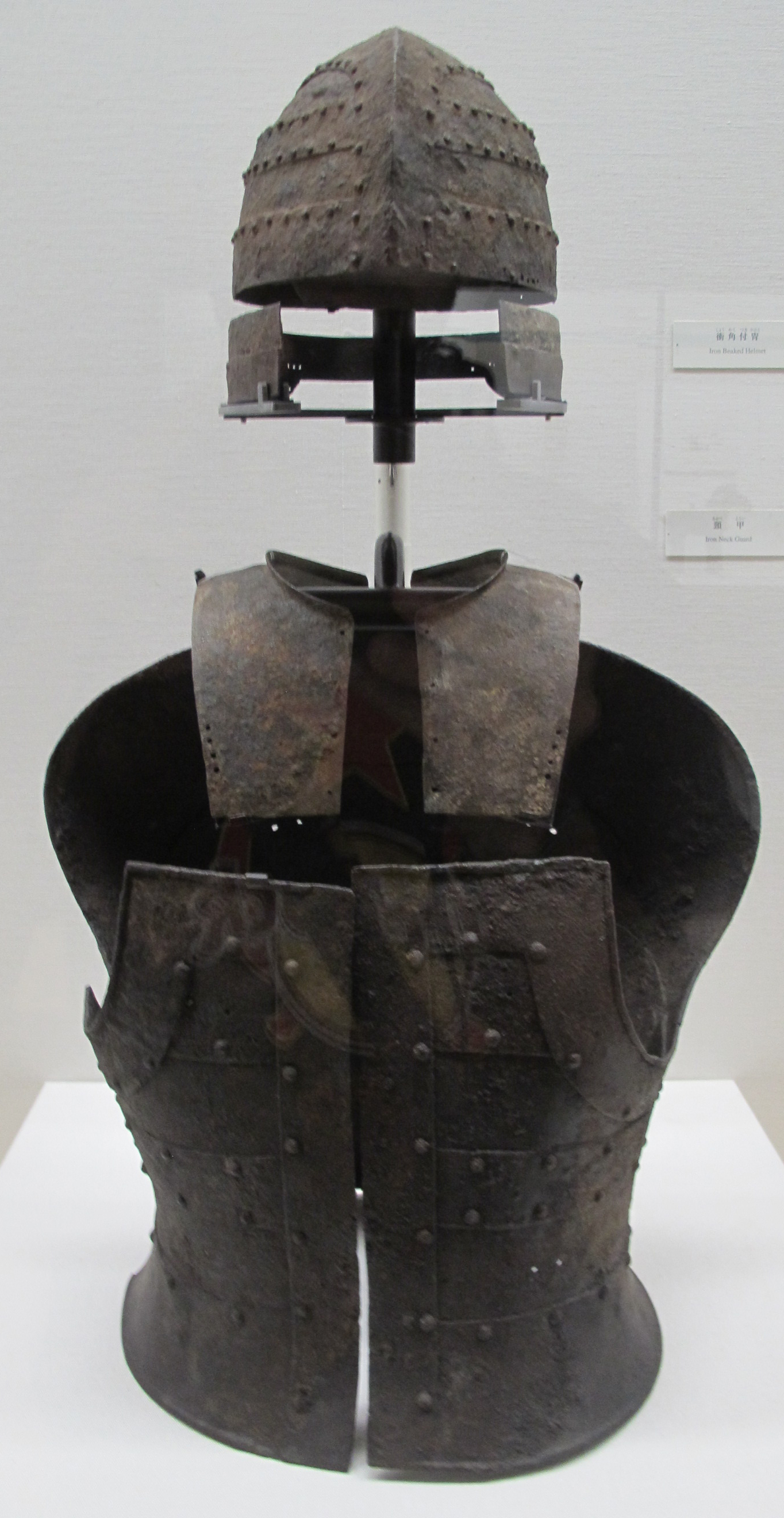
Iron armor set with tankō style cuirass

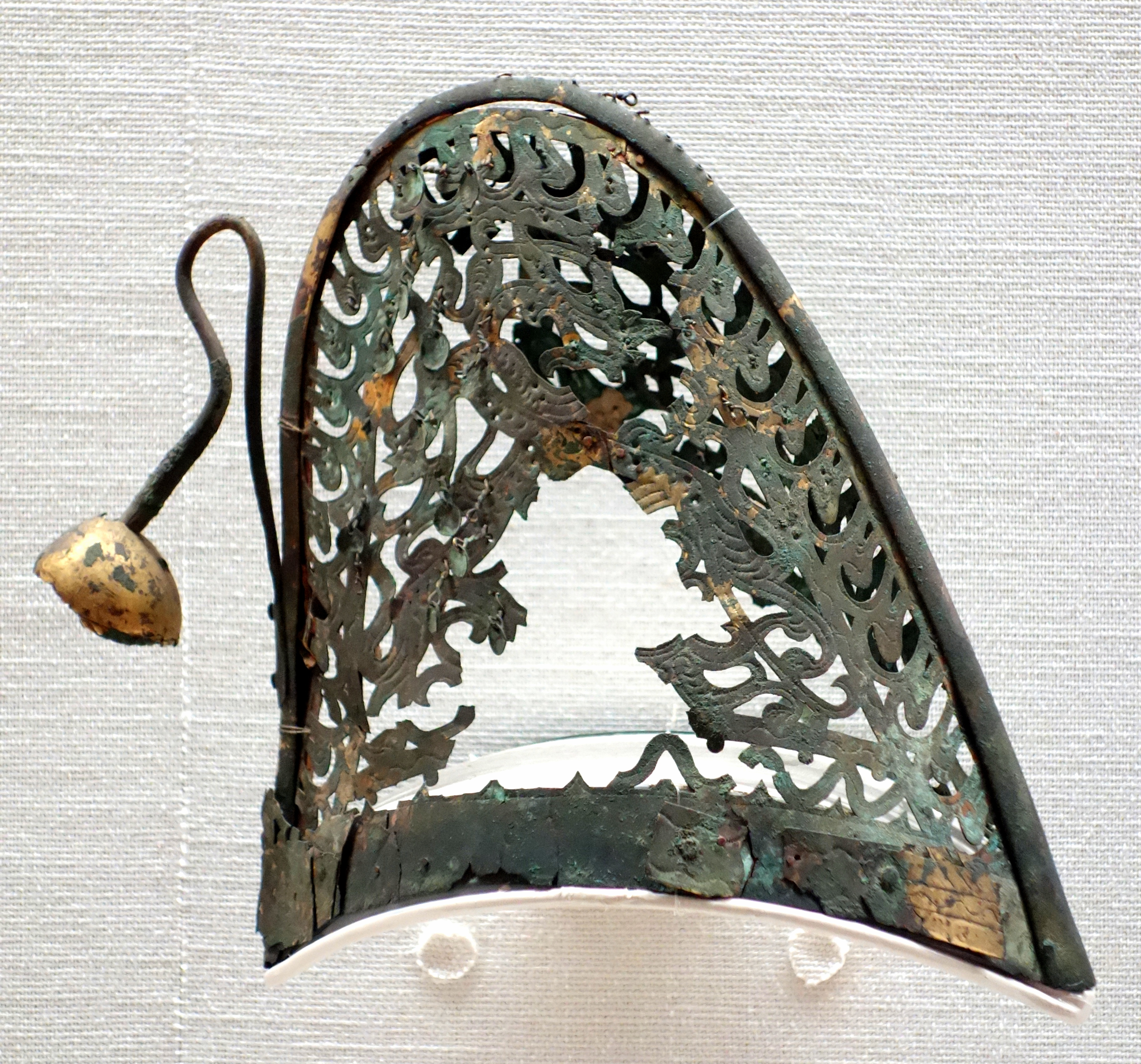
Bronze crown with traces of gilding

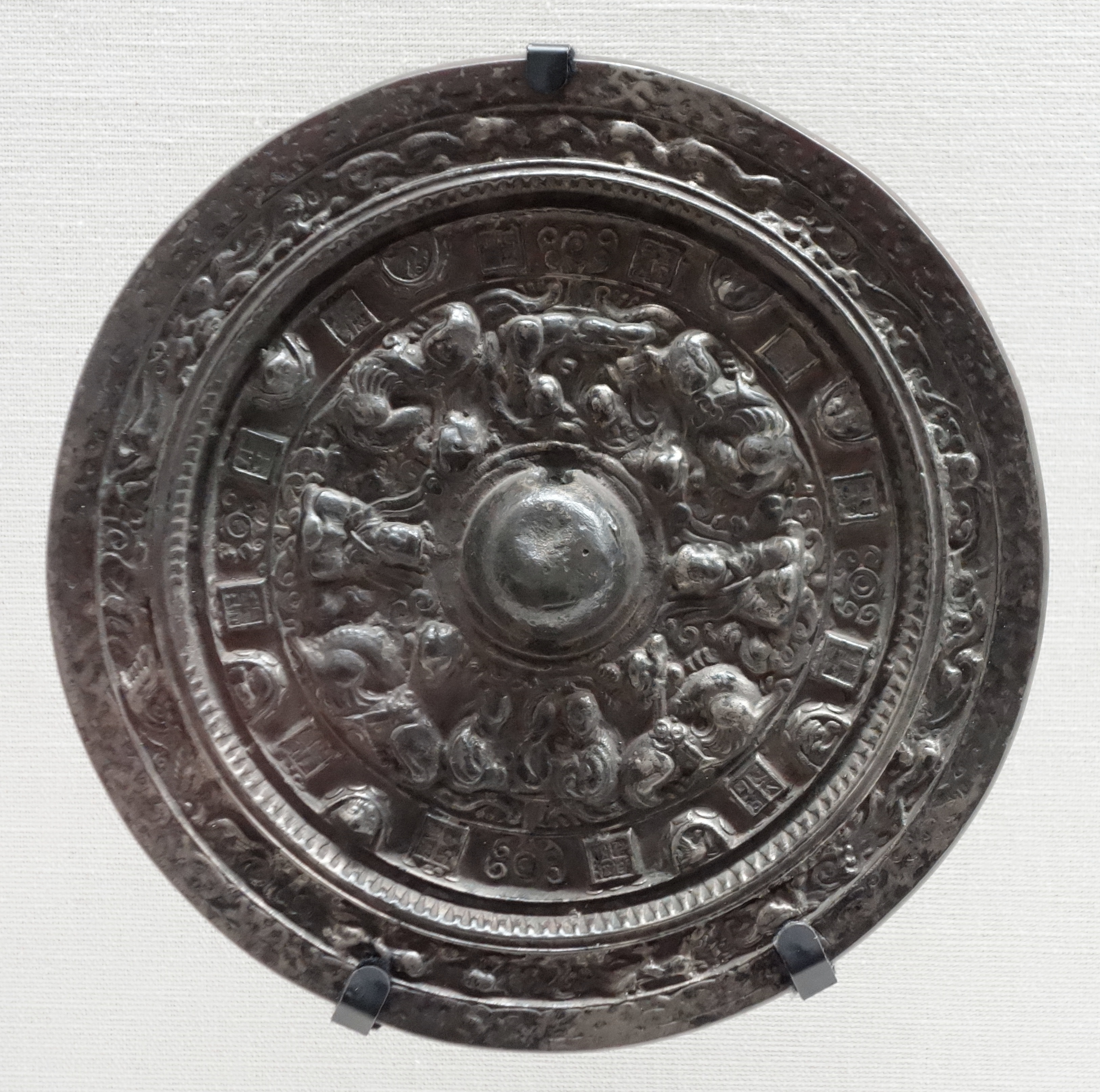
Bronze mirror of Chinese origin

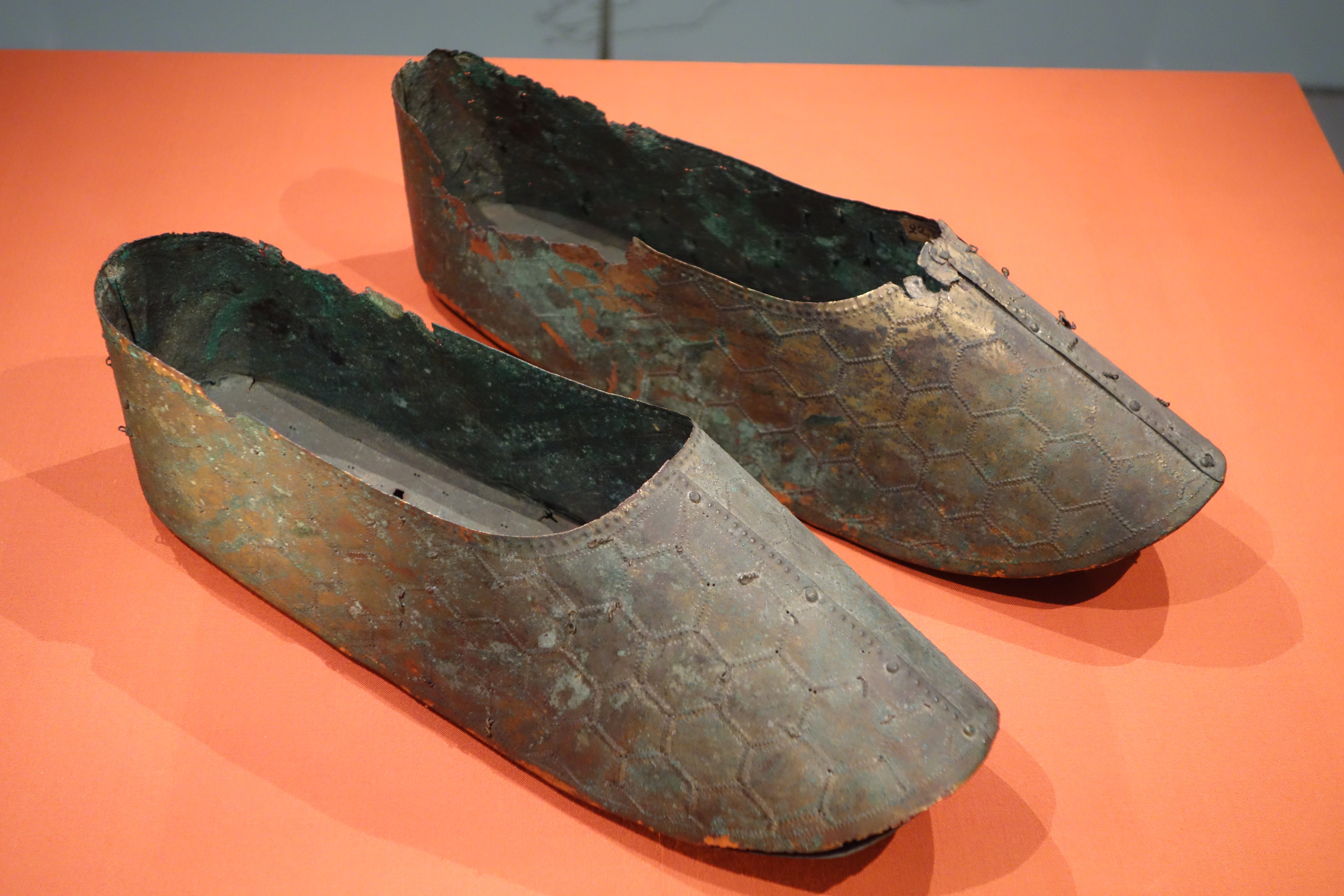
Bronze shoes with hexagonal pattern
