= Kubote Historical Museum =

- 求菩提資料館
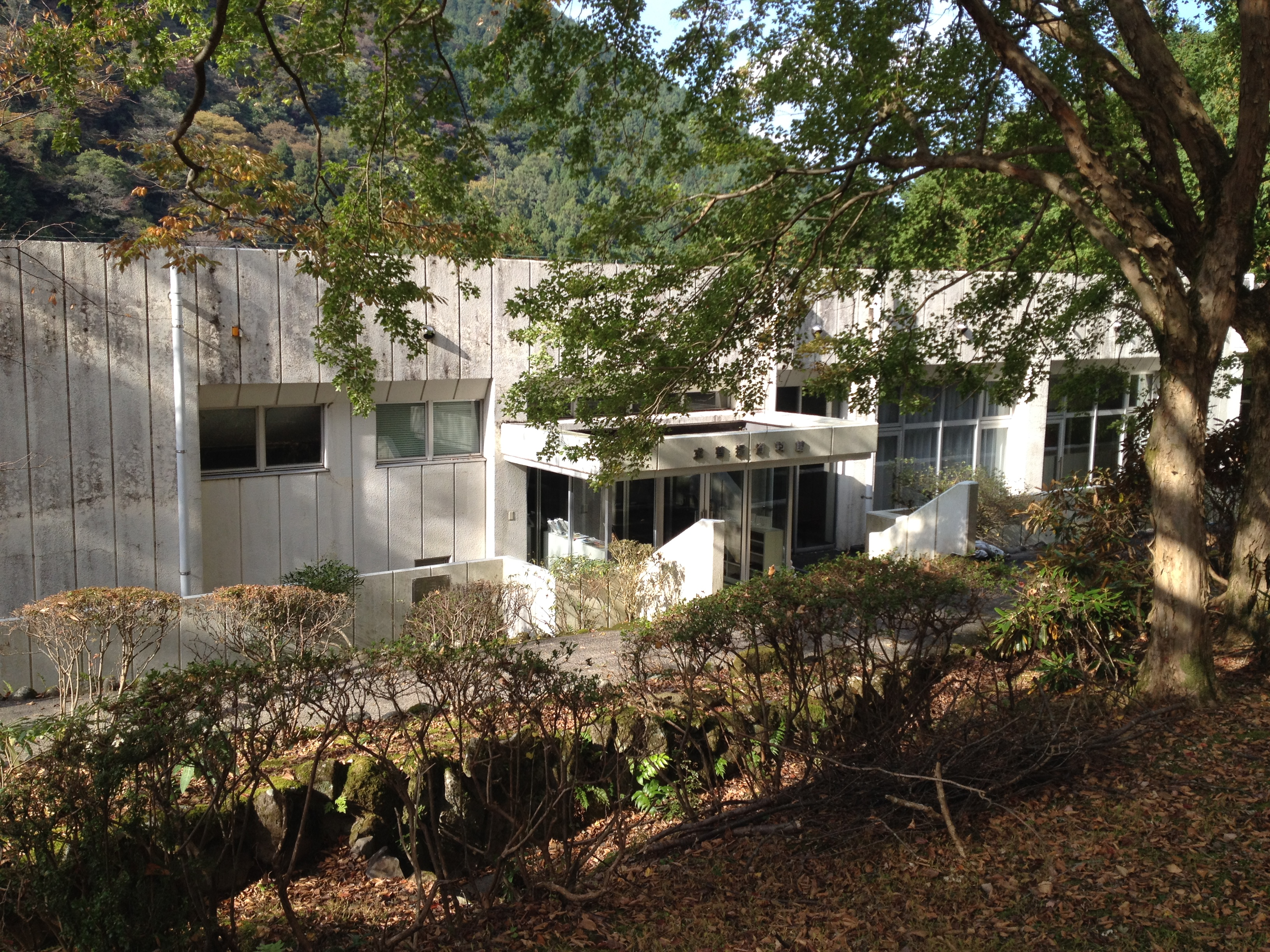
- Interactive map of the Kubote Historical Museum area

General information
- Location: 247 Toriihata, Buzen, Fukuoka Prefecture, Japan
- Coordinates: 33°32′11″N 131°01′03″E
- Opened: November 1974

Website
- Official website

Kubote Historical Museum (求菩提資料館, Kubote Shiryōkan) opened in Buzen, Fukuoka Prefecture, Japan in 1974. The collection includes some five thousand items relating to the shugendō practices of Mount Kubote (求菩提山), a National Historic Site, and of Japan more generally and there is also material relating to Buzen Kagura, an Important Intangible Folk Cultural Property. In November 2017 the museum closed for several months for works on the ageing building and in February 2018 Buzen City appealed to the prefectural government for funds for a replacement facility.

== See also ==
- List of National Treasures of Japan (archaeological materials)
- Kyushu Historical Museum
- List of Historic Sites of Japan (Fukuoka)
