= Engaru Archaeological Center =

Facility in Engaru, Hokkaido, Japan

- 遠軽町埋蔵文化財センター
- Interactive map of the Engaru Archaeological Center area

General information
- Location: 1381-1 Shirataki, Engaru, Hokkaido, Japan
- Coordinates: 43°53′12″N 143°11′34″E

Website
- Official website (in Japanese)

Engaru Archaeological Center (遠軽町埋蔵文化財センター, Engaru-chō Maizō Bunkazai Sentā) is a buried cultural property center in Engaru, Hokkaido, Japan. Together with the Shirataki Geopark Visitor Center, it is located within the Shirataki General Branch Office building. Mount Akaishi (赤石山) is the largest source of obsidian in the country and the collection and displays include an assemblage of palaeolithic artefacts from the Shirataki sites that has been designated a National Treasure.

== See also ==
- List of National Treasures of Japan (archaeological materials)
- List of Cultural Properties of Japan - archaeological materials (Hokkaidō)
- List of Historic Sites of Japan (Hokkaido)
- Hokkaido Heritage
- Hokkaido Museum
