= Tamagawa Museum of Modern Art, Imabari =

Art museum in Imabari, Ehime, Japan

- 今治市玉川近代美術館
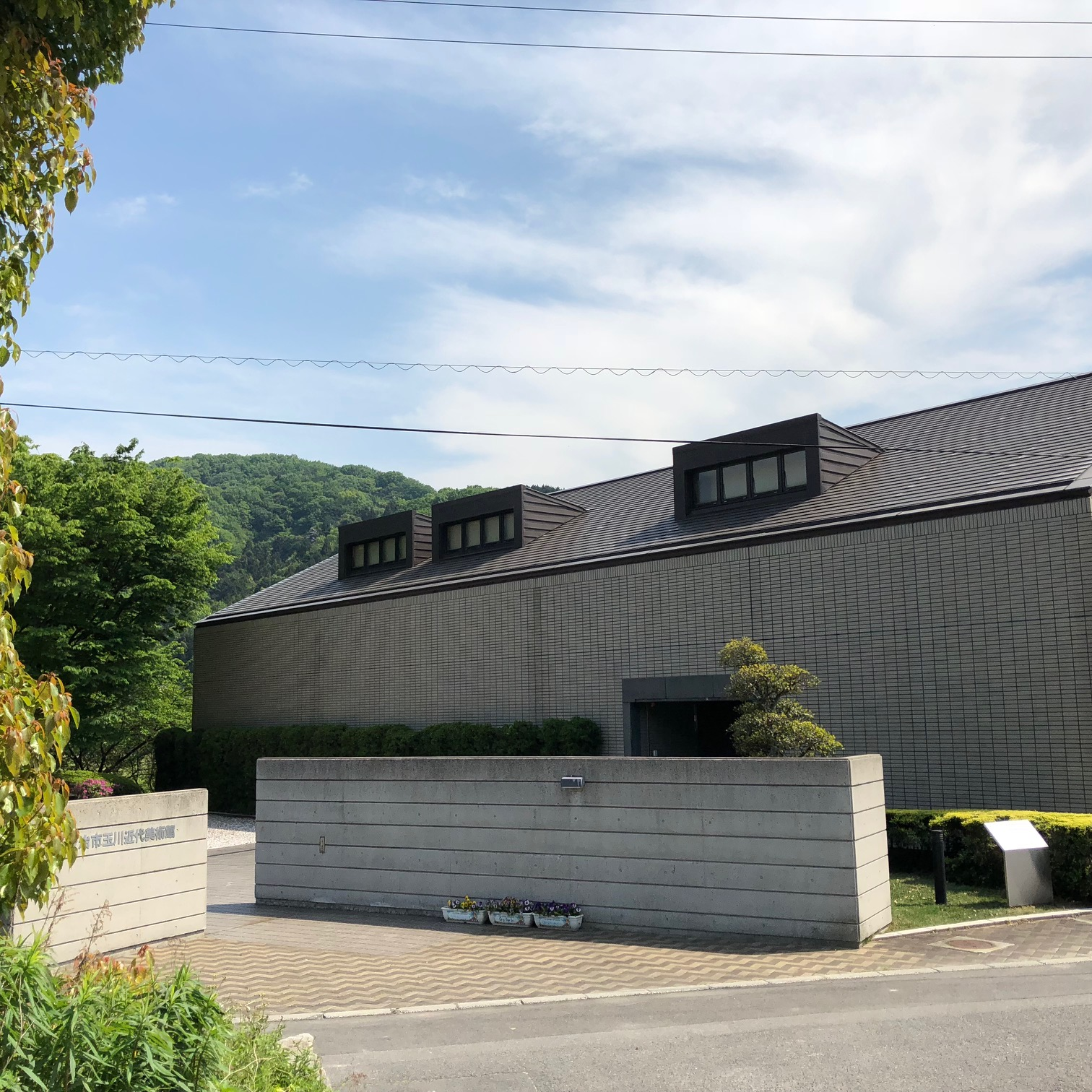

General information
- Location: 86-4 Ōno, Tamagawa-chō, Imabari, Ehime Prefecture, Japan
- Coordinates: 34°01′19″N 132°56′40″E
- Opened: 3 December 1986

Website
- Official website (in Japanese)

Tamagawa Museum of Modern Art, Imabari (今治市玉川近代美術館, Imabari-shi Tamagawa Kindai Bijutsukan) opened in Tamagawa, now Imabari, Ehime Prefecture, Japan in 1986. The museum also goes by the name of the Tokusei Kinenkan (徳生記念館), after the late Tokusei Tadatsune, who provided the funds. The collection includes works by Gauguin, Dalí, Hiroshige, Kuroda Seiki, and Nakamura Tsune, as well as the National Treasure Artefacts from Mount Narabara Sutra Mound, Iyo Province.

== See also ==
- List of National Treasures of Japan (archaeological materials)
- Toyo Ito Museum of Architecture, Imabari
- Murakami Kaizoku Museum
- Imabari Castle
