= Kongōshō-ji =

Rinzai Zen Buddhist temple, Japan

- 金剛證寺
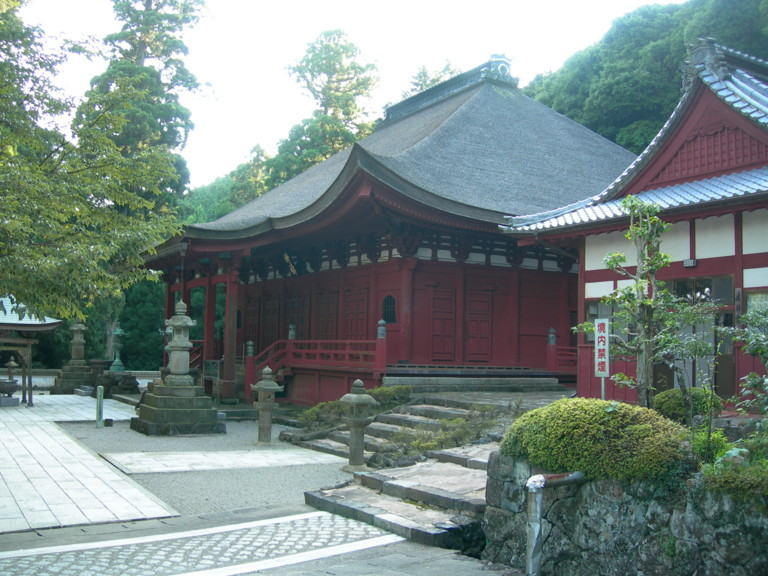
- Kongōshō-ji Main Hall

- Kongōshō-ji Kongōshō-ji (Japan)

Religion
- Affiliation: Buddhist
- Deity: Kokūzō Bosatsu
- Rite: Rinzai school

Location
- Location: 548 Dake, Asamacho Ise-shi, Mie-ken
- Country: Japan
- Interactive map of Kongōshō-ji
- Coordinates: 34°27′27″N 136°47′08″E

Architecture
- Founder: c. Emperor Kinmei
- Completed: c.mid-6th century

Kongōshō-ji (金剛證寺) is a Rinzai school Zen Buddhist temple in the Asamacho neighborhood of the city of Ise, Mie Prefecture Japan. Its main image is a statue of Kokūzō Bosatsu. Founded in the Asuka period, it has been closely associated with the Ise Grand Shrine throughout its history and contains numerous National Treasures and Important Cultural Properties. The sutra mounds found on Mount Asama behind the temple were designated a National Historic Site in 1936.

== History ==
The early history of Kongōshō-ji is uncertain. The temple claims that it was founded by Emperor Kinmei, who ordered the monk Kyōtai to build a chapel on this site in the middle of the 6th century. Later, Kūkai converted this chapel into a dojo for the teaching of Shingon esoteric Buddhism in 825 AD. As Kongōshō-ji is located to the northeast of the Ise Grand Shrine, it was regarded as the protector of the spiritually vulnerable northeastern direction from the shrine. Furthermore, under the Shinbutsu-shūgō doctrines of medieval Japan, Kokūzō Bosatsu was regarded as an avatar of Amaterasu, the principal kami of the Ise Grand Shrine, and thus the temple was regarded as an inner sanctum of that shrine. It attracted many pilgrims and grew to be the largest temple in Ise and Shima Provinces. The temple went into slow decline in the later Heian and Kamakura periods, until the priest Togaku Buniku of Kenchō-ji in Kamakura converted it into a Rinzai Zen temple in 1392. The temple was patronized by the naval commander Kuki Yoshitaka during the Sengoku period, becoming the bodaiji of the Kuki clan. During the Edo period, the temple was supported by the Tokugawa shogunate. Its Hondō was built by Ikeda Terumasa in 1609, and was restored after a fire in 1701 by Keishōin, the mother of Shōgun Tokugawa Tsunayoshi. It is designated a National Important Cultural Property.

Following the Meiji restoration, the temple continued to draw pilgrims and tourists, especially after the construction of a cable car in 1925 to facilitate the steep climb up the mountain. However, the cable car was scrapped for metal during World War II, and visitors declined in numbers, especially after damage sustained in the Isewan Typhoon of 1959. This situation changed after the opening of the Iseshima Skyline highway in 1964.

== Gallery ==
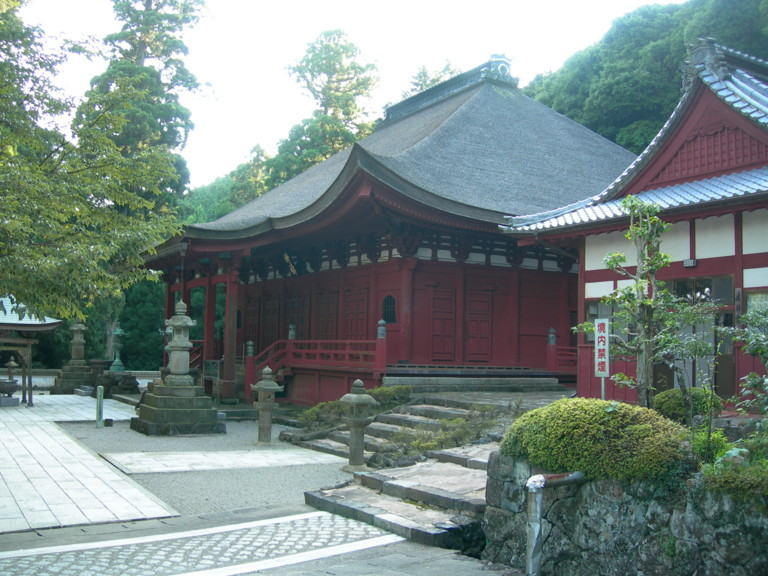
Hondō

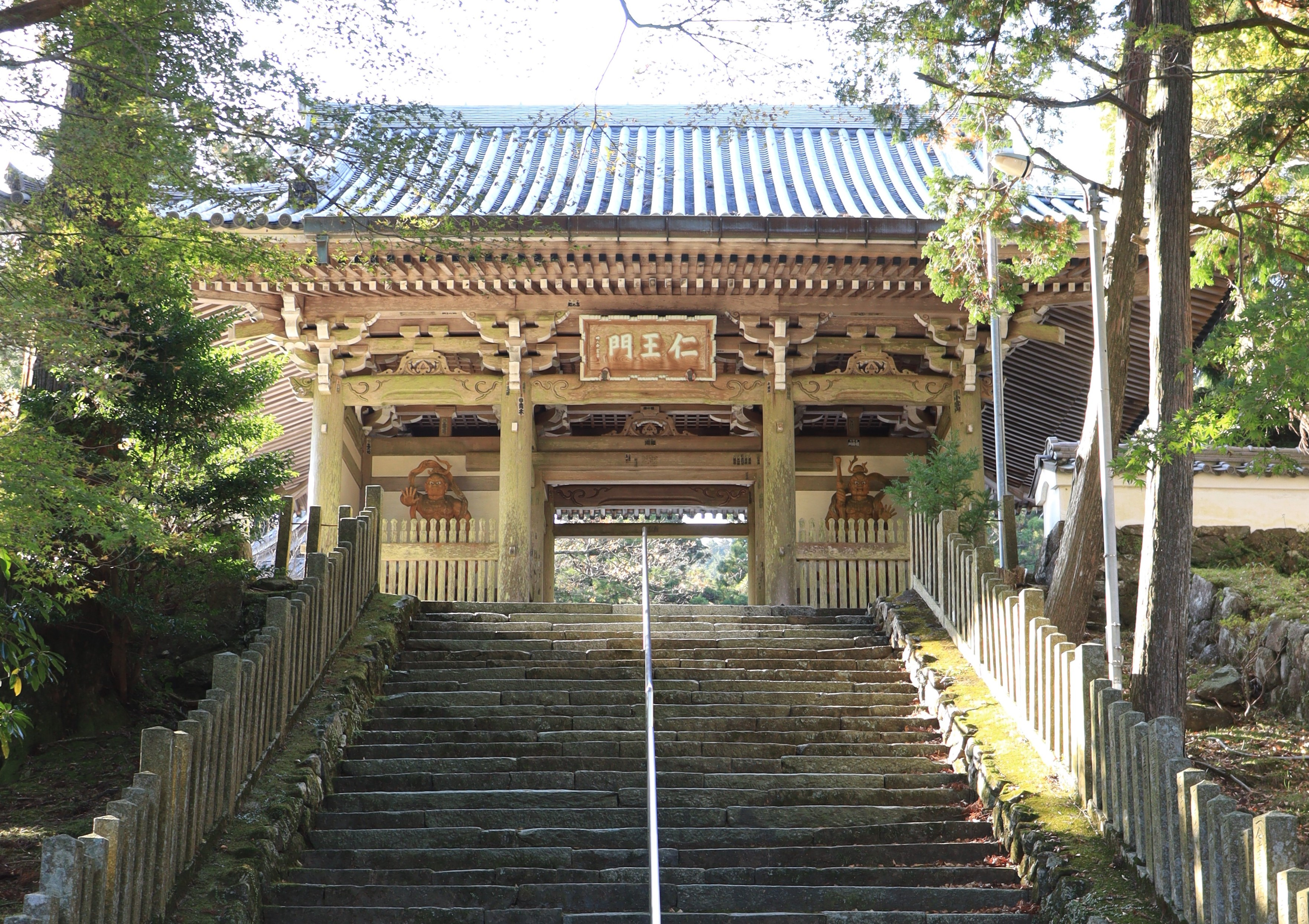
Niō-mon (rebuilt in 1979)

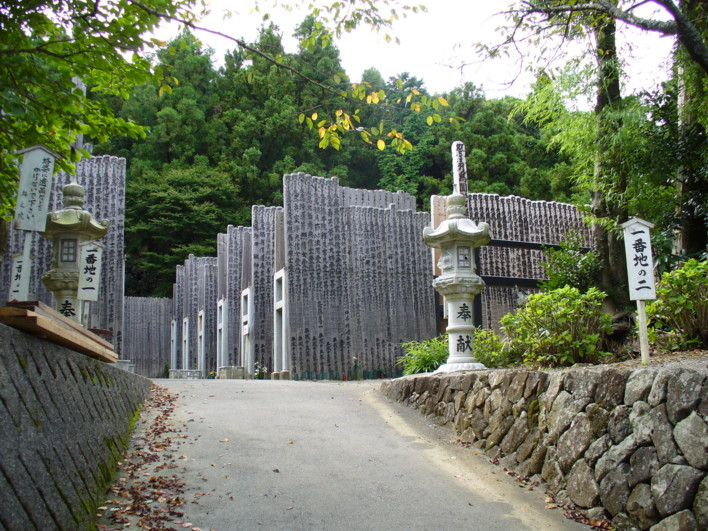
Oku-no-in

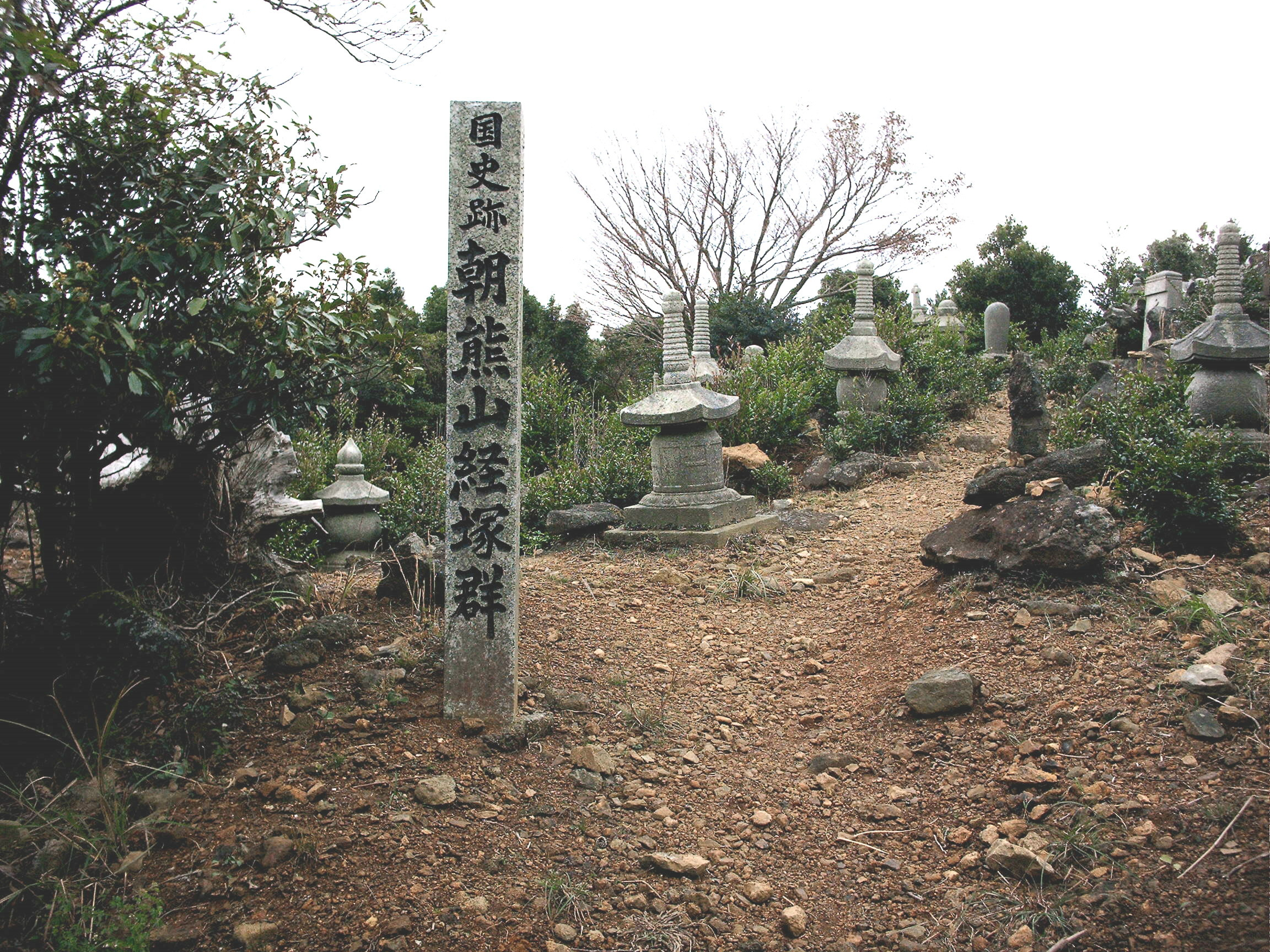
Asamayama Sutra Mounds

== Sutra mounds ==
About 40 sutra mounds have been confirmed at the summit of Mount Asakuma. The existence of the mounds was known since the Meiji era, but more mounds were found after damage caused by the 1959 Isewan Typhoon. The mounds consist of a chamber built from mountain stones, and many were found to contain artifacts from end of the Heian period. In 1966, the area was designated as a National Historic Site, and many of the excavated items were collectively designated as a National Treasure in 1963. Many of these items are exhibited in the temple museum. These include bronze sutra containers, mirrors with Amida and the Amida triad, and ceramics. The area of funerary monuments where these items were found has been designated an Historic Site.

== Buildings ==
The Hondō is a seven by six bay, yosemune-zukuri building with a hinoki bark roof. Built in 1609, it is an Important Cultural Property.

== Cultural Properties ==
- Kuki Yoshitaka portrait (1607) (Important Cultural Property).
- Uhōdōji statue (Heian period) (Important Cultural Property).
- Jizō Bosatsu statue (Kamakura period) (Important Cultural Property).
- Tachi (Heian period) (Important Cultural Property).
- Bronze mirror with twin phoenixes (Heian period) (Important Cultural Property).
- Artifacts from the Asamayama sutra mounds (1159–1173) (National Treasure).

== See also ==
- Ise Jingū
- List of National Treasures of Japan (archaeological materials)
- List of Historic Sites of Japan (Mie)
