= Kamoiwakura Site =

Yayoi period settlement trace in Unnan, Shimane, Japan

- 加茂岩倉遺跡 (Japanese)
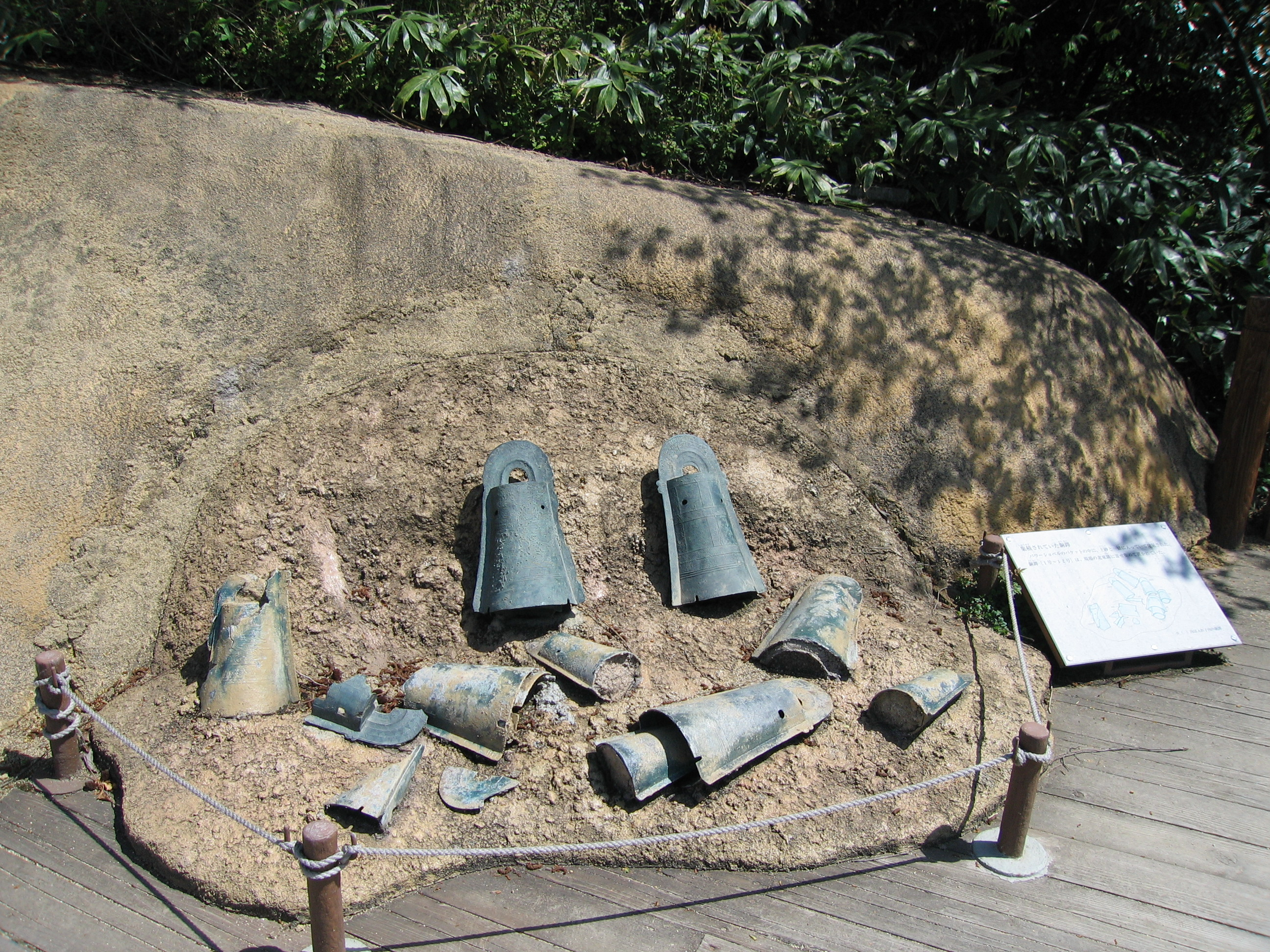
- Kamoiwakura Site

- Kamoiwakura Site Kamoiwakura Site (Japan)
- Interactive map of Kamoiwakura Site
- 35°21′38″N 132°52′59″E
- Periods: Yayoi period
- Location: Unnan, Shimane, Japan
- Region: San'in region

Site notes
- Public access: Yes (park and museum)

The Kamoiwakura Site (加茂岩倉遺跡, Kamoiwakura iseki) is an archaeological site located in the Kamo neighborhood of the city of Unnan, Shimane Prefecture, in the San'in Region of Japan. It was designated a National Historic Site in 2019.

== Overview ==
The Kamoiwakura Site is located in eastern Shimane, where the Hii River joins its tributary, the Aka River, in a narrow valley at an elevation of 138 meters, It was discovered on October 14, 1996, during the construction of a farm road in Iwakura no Oka, Kamo, Shimane when a heavy machinery operator heard a strange sound during excavation and immediately stopped the equipment to investigate. The machine had struck a buried cache of bronze dōtaku, bell-shaped objects unique to the Yayoi period whose origin and purpose is still being debated by researchers. There are also theories that they used as a ritual instrument to pray for a bountiful harvest, or that it was used as an ornamental instrument. Most have been unearthed in western Japan, mainly in the Kinki region, and also in northern Kyushu. Of the approximately 470 dōtaku that have been excavated nationwide, a total of 50 have been unearthed from Izumo. In many cases the dōtaku appear to have been buried on the outskirts of a settlement for some ritual purpose.

For two years from 1996 to 1997, an archaeological excavation was conducted by the Kamo Town Board of Education and the Shimane Prefectural Board of Education. As a result, a total of 39 dōtaku were discovered, which is the largest number among excavated from one location in Japan. The 24 dōtaku found at the Ōiwayama Site in Yasu, Shiga was previously had the largest. Many of dōtaku were stored in a "nested" state with a small dōtaku inside a large dōtaku. The dōtaku were produced in the middle of the Yayoi period, or approximately 2000 years ago, with 20 of the dōtaku approximately 45 cm in size and 19 approximately 30 cm in size. The pattern is either a flowing water pattern, or a pattern called Kesatasukimon, in which lines are drawn vertically and horizontally.

Among the dōtaku, there are several with line engraving depictions of human faces, dragonflies, deer, wild boars, and soft-shelled turtles. There are 26 pieces of the 39 which were made with the same mold, and the same type have also been unearthed at sites in Tottori, Hyogo, Nara, Wakayama, and Fukui. It is believed that these were produced in the Kinki region, although others in the cache are thought to have been produced in the Izumo region, judging from the characteristics of the patterns. The pit where these artifacts were buried was a rectangular measuring one by two meters, with a depth of about 50 centimeters.

In 1999, the 39 dōtaku were designated as National Important Cultural Properties, and in July 2008, the designation was elevated to that of a National Treasure. In 1997, another pit located three meters away was discovered, but it contained no artifacts. The dōtaku are displayed in the Shimane Museum of Ancient Izumo.

The Kamoiwakura Site is located only three kilometers across a mountain from the Kōjindani Site, another Yayoi period site where a large number of 358 copper swords was unearthed. The Kamoiwakura Site is approximately six minutes by care from Kamonaka Station on the JR West Kisuki Line. The Kamoiwakura Ruins Guidance Center is open right next to the site, with a restoration depicting the pit with reconstructions of the dōtaku in situ.

== See also ==
- List of Historic Sites of Japan (Shimane)
