= Kamonaka Station =

Railway station in Unnan, Shimane Prefecture, Japan

Kamonaka Station 加茂中駅
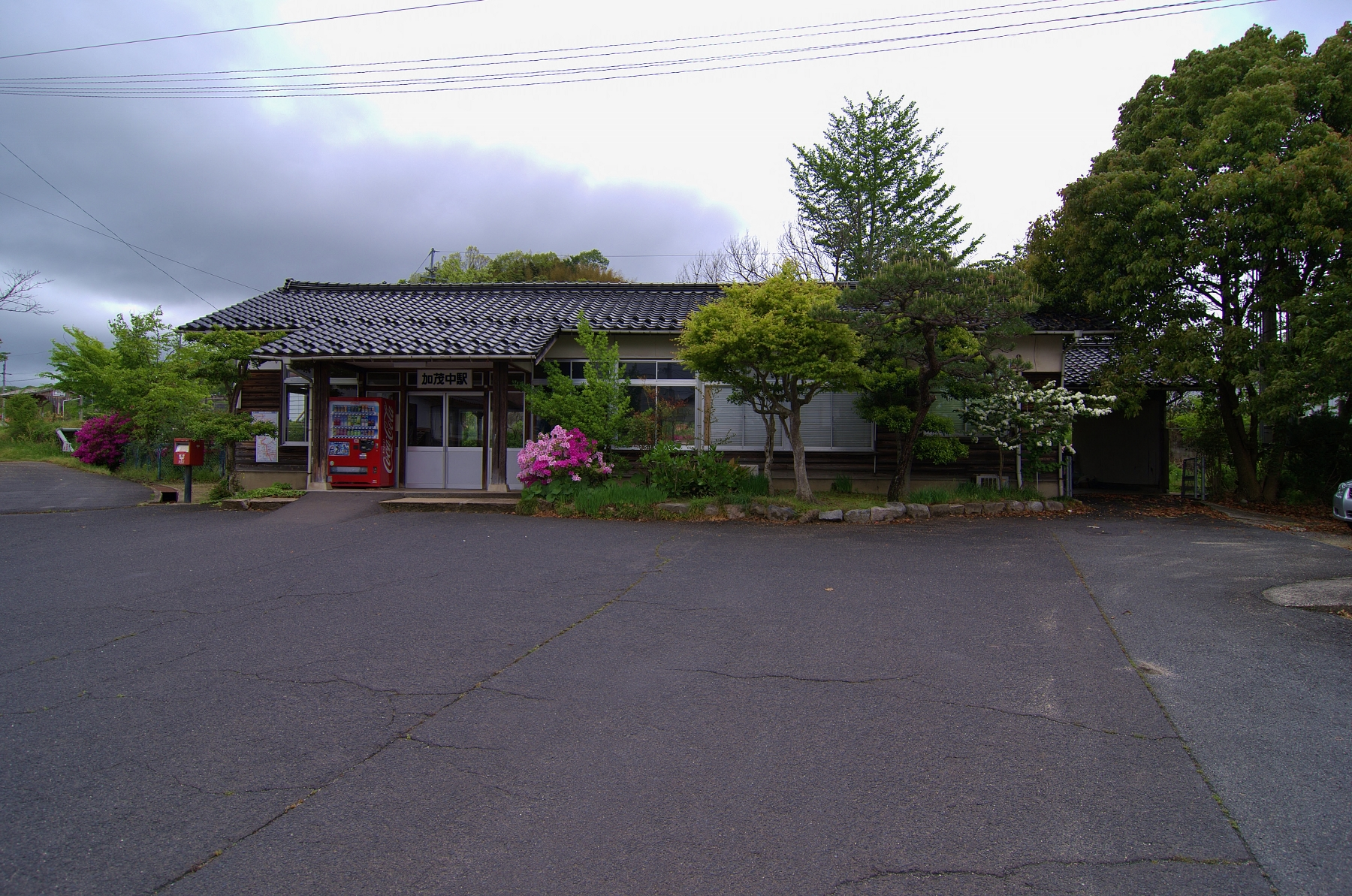
- JR Kamonaka station

General information
- Location: 1128, Kamo-chō Kamonaka, Unnan-shi, Shimane-ken 699-1106; Japan
- Coordinates: 35°20′38.78″N 132°54′37.88″E
- Operator: JR West
- Line: E Kisuki Line
- Distance: 8.7 km (5.4 miles) from Shinji
- Platforms: 1 island platform
- Tracks: 2

Other information
- Status: Staffed
- Website: Official website

History
- Opened: 11 October 1916

Passengers
- 2020: 53 daily

Services
Preceding station	JR West	Following station
Minami Shinji towards Shinji	Kisuki Line	Hataya towards Bingo Ochiai
Location
- Location within Shimane Prefecture Location within Japan

Kamonaka Station (加茂中駅, Kamonaka-eki) is a passenger railway station located in the city of Unnan, Shimane Prefecture, Japan. It is operated by the West Japan Railway Company (JR West).

== Lines ==
Kamonaka Station is served by the Kisuki Line, and is located 8.7 kilometers from the terminus of the line at Shinji.

== Station layout ==
The station consists of one ground-level island platform connected to the station building by a level crossing. The station is staffed.

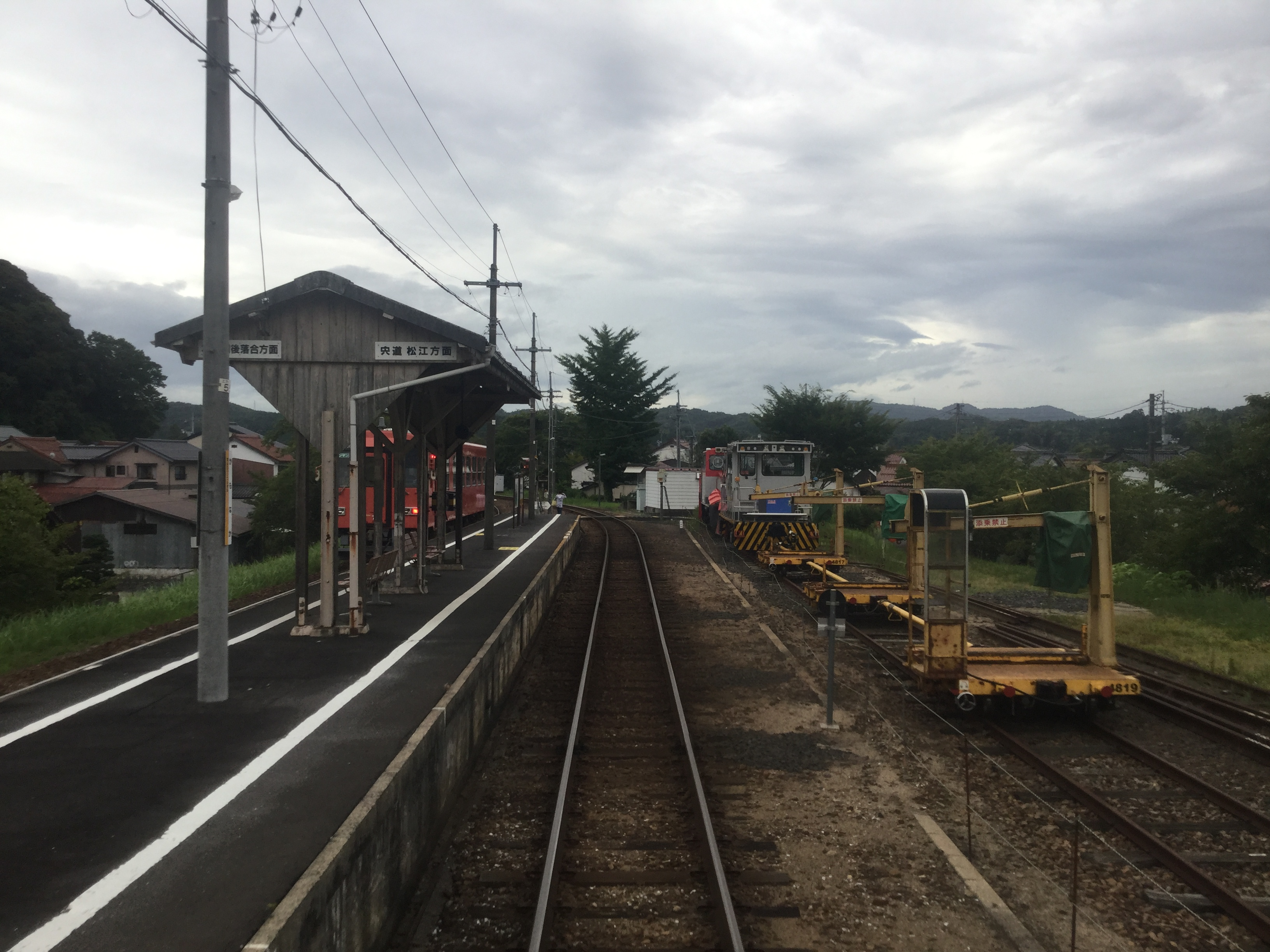
Station platform, 2019

=== Platforms ===
1	■ E Kisuki Line	for Shinji
2	■ E Kisuki Line	for Kisuki and Izumo Yokota

== History ==
Kamonaka Station was opened on 11 October 1916 on the Hinokami Railway. The railway was nationalized on 12 December 1932, becoming the Kisuki Line, and the line was extended to Izumo Minari Station. It became part of JR West on 1 April 1987 when Japan National Railways was privatized.

== Passenger statistics ==
In fiscal 2019, the station was used by an average of 53 passengers daily.

== Surrounding area ==
- Unnan City Kamo Cultural Hall La Mer
- Kamoiwakura Site
- Japan National Route 54

== See also ==
- List of railway stations in Japan
