= Tankō =

Type of Japanese armor

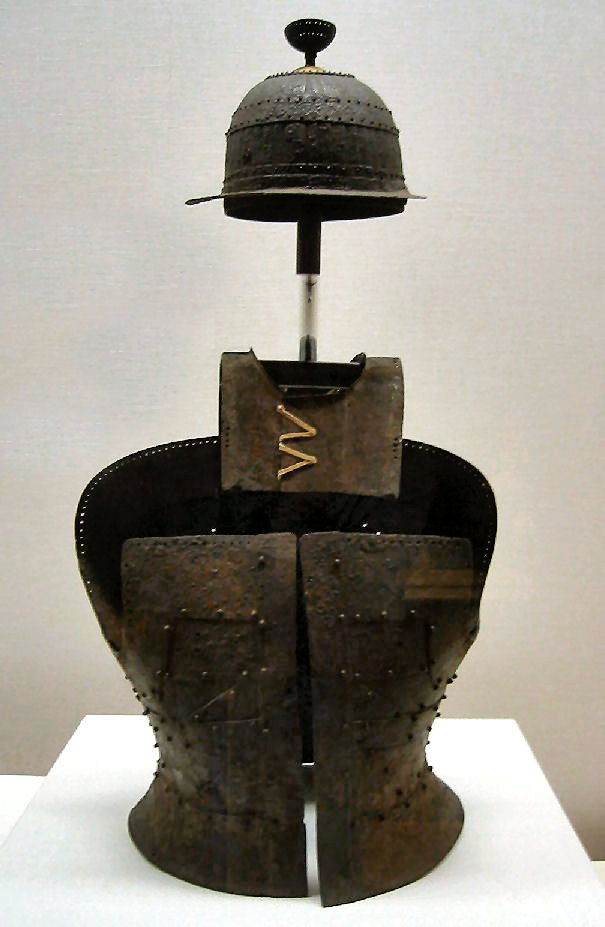
Tankō and Helm (Kabuto), displayed in the Tokyo National Museum.

Tankō (Jap. 短甲 "short armor") is a form of Japanese armor that was common in the Kofun period.

== Tankō ==
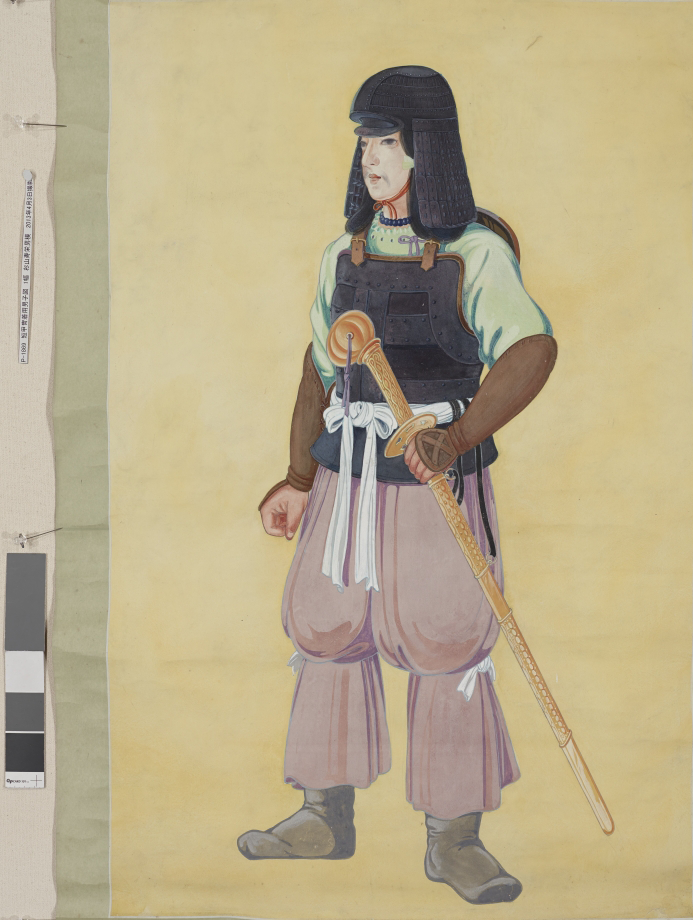
Tanko Armor by Sugiyama Sueo

The tankō is the first uniquely definable type of Japanese armour. Earlier forms, such as the jōdai no katchū described by Suenaga Masao (d. 1991), are not fully verifiable.

Tankō was made of sheet iron and tanned leather, laced at the hips to conform to the wearer's body. The leather served as support for the iron sheets and as a protective lining to prevent damage to the wearer's clothing and skin. The iron sheets were formed into strips that were riveted side by side or overlapping. The carapace was raised above the breastplate to protect the neck. The front side had an opening that could be closed once the armor was donned. The tankō was attached to the body via fabric bands that ran over the shoulders.

== Keikō ==
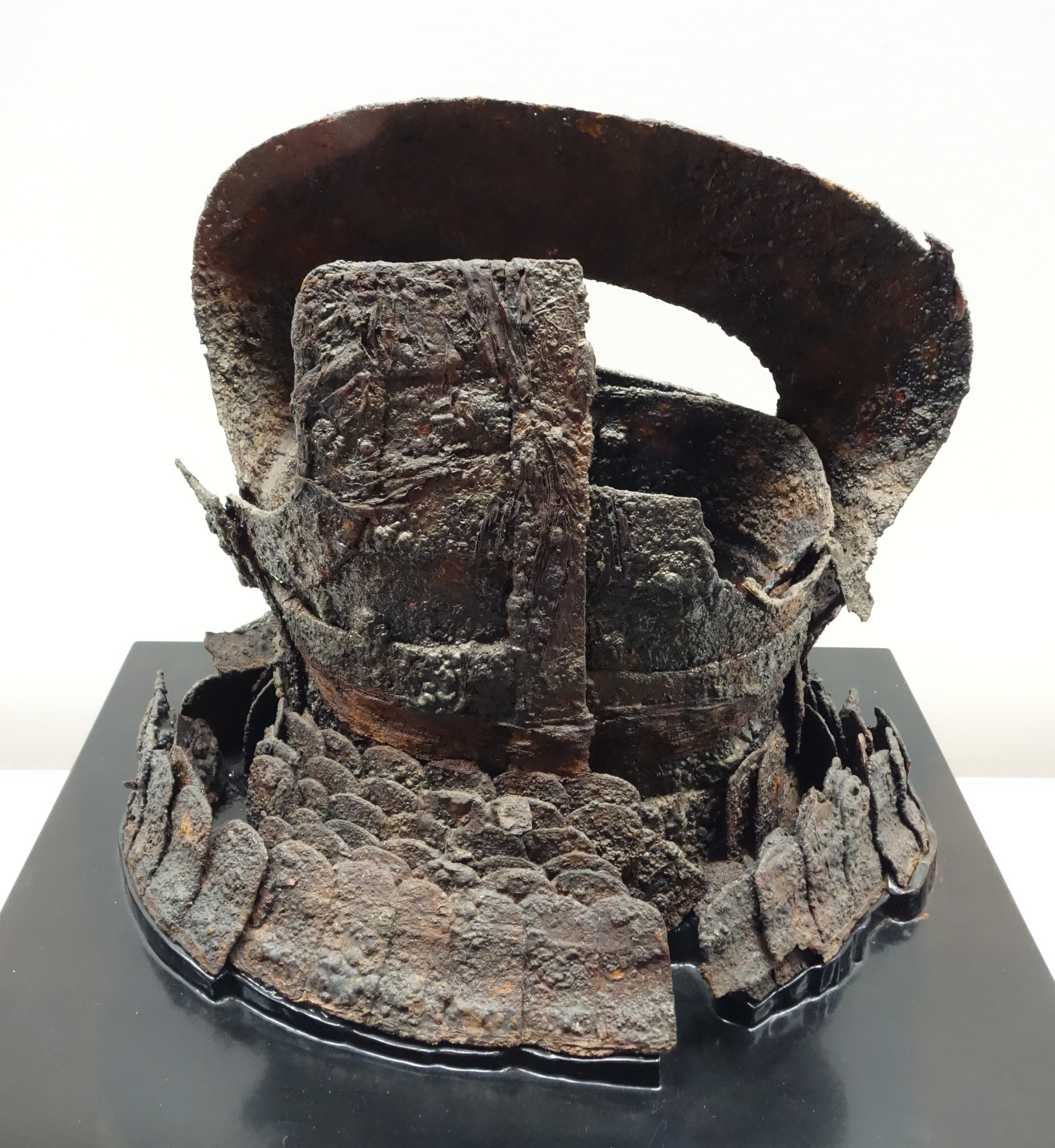
Keikō armor

Another Japanese armor type from the Kofun period, the keikō ("hanging armor"). The type was also used in Japan as armor for mounted forces as the use of cavalry in warfare increased in importance. The difference between the tankō and keikō lies in the upper chest area of the armor, which in the keikō variant included a protective sheath of iron bands. The lower portion of both types consisted of overlapping iron lammellae. The use of leather underpinnings was also used by both forms. The bands were fixed together through riveting or the use of leather straps.

== Helmet ==
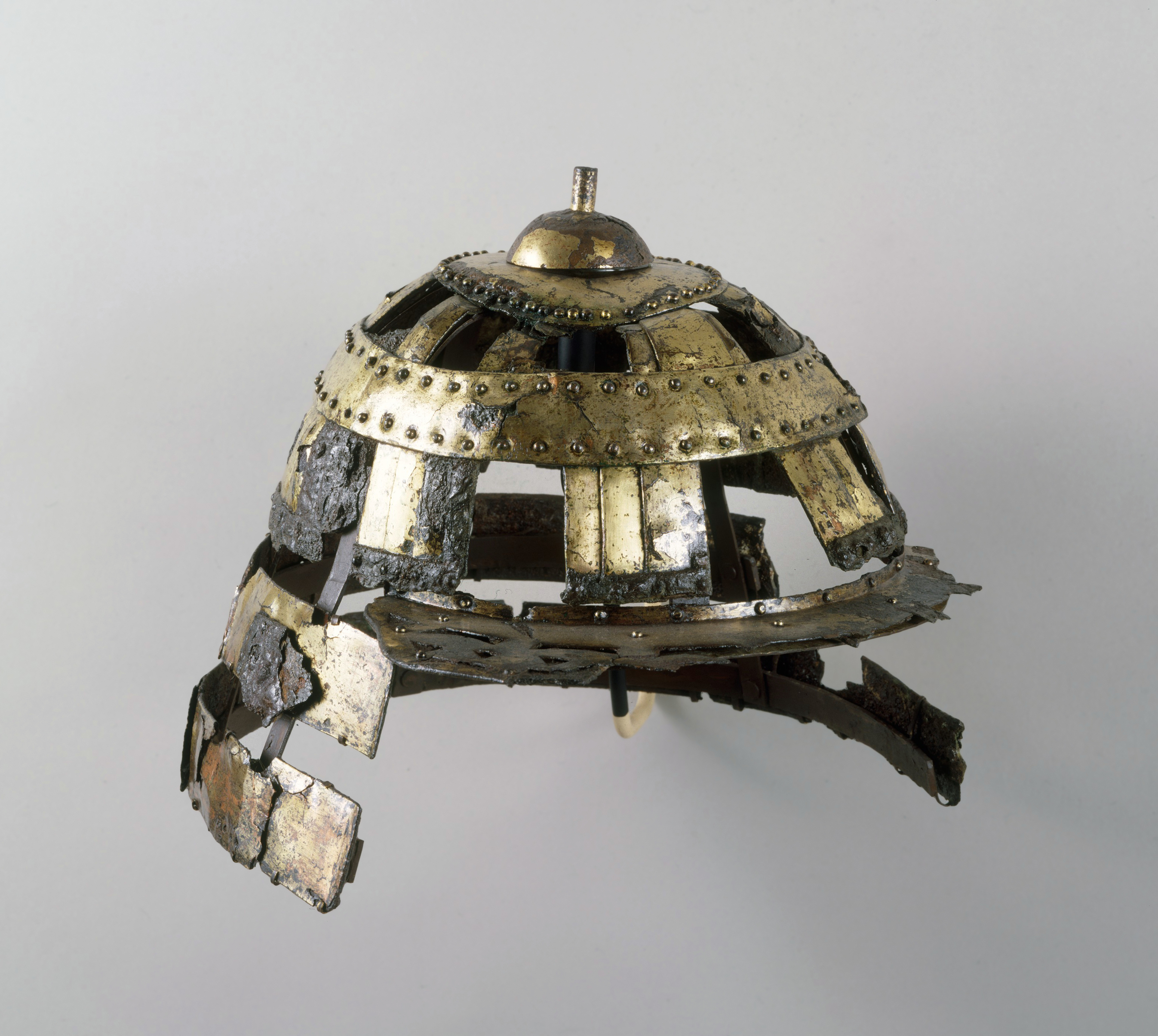
Kofun helm (1st version) in Metropolitan Museum, New York

The helmets (mabisashi) worn with the tankō armor type are known in two versions. The first type (jap. Kondu Maruhachi) consisted of sheets of overlapping iron similar to the tankō chest piece). Lamella pieces were riveted to horizontally arranged bands to create a dome shape for the helmet. A short eye shield was attached to the front and was often pierced with holes. A small hump with a fixing pin for a crest lay at the top of the helmet’s dome.

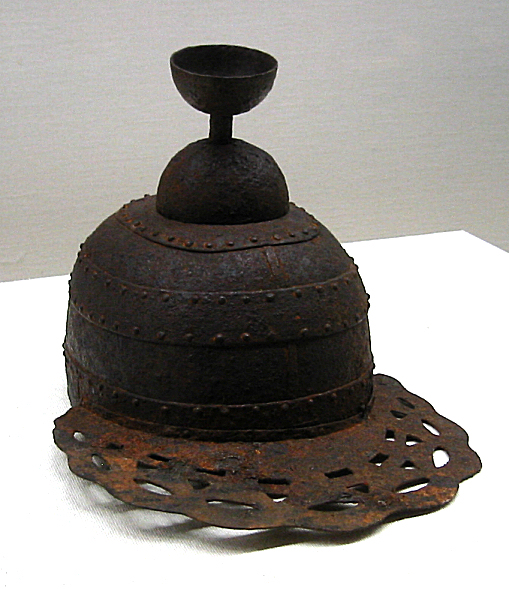
Kofun helm (2nd version)

The second type was created differently, with horizontal and vertical bands throughout the helm's dome. The eye shield and attachment for the crest were much larger. The attachment also included a shell-like form that served to further fasten and accentuate the crest.

== Shield ==
The shield worn with this type of armor was made of sheet iron fixed to a wooden base. The shield's components were fixed to each other and the shield's body through the use of riveting. The exterior has a slightly convex shape, and was decorated with triangular and linear patterns.

== Naming origins ==
The names tankō and keikō are not historical, but archaeological in origin. In the sacrificial book of Tōdai-ji from 756 tankō and keikō are listed as gifts. These terms were then assigned to varying types of excavated armor.

== Literature ==
- 講談社, Japan. An illustrated encyclopedia. Band 1: A – L. Kodansha, Tokio 1993, ISBN 4-06-206489-8.
- William Wayne Farris: Sacred texts and buried treasures. Issues in the historical archaeology of ancient Japan. University of Hawai'i Press, Honolulu HI 1998, ISBN 0-8248-1966-7.
- Karl Friday: Samurai, warfare and the state in early medieval Japan. Routledge, New York NY u. a. 2004, ISBN 0-415-32962-0, S. 186, 187.
- Thomas Louis, Tommy Ito: Samurai. The Code of the Warrior. Sterling Publishing Company, New York NY 2008, ISBN 978-1-4027-6312-0.
