= Kōjindani Site =

Archaeological site

- 荒神谷遺跡 (Japanese)
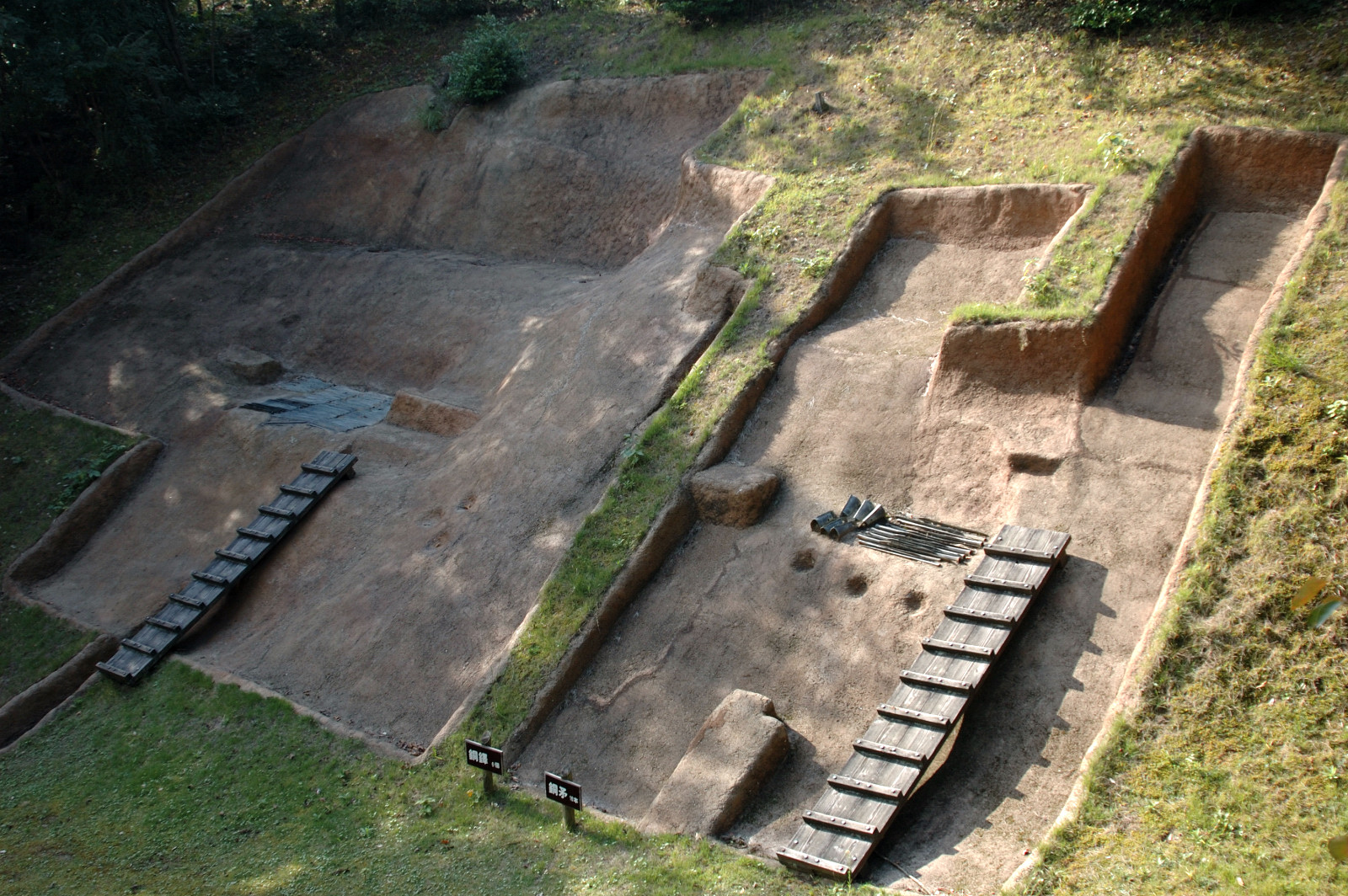
- Kōjindani Site

- Kōjindani Site Kōjindani Site (Japan)
- Interactive map of Kōjindani Site
- 35°22′35.4″N 132°51′8.7″E
- Periods: Yayoi period
- Location: Izumo, Shimane, Japan
- Region: San'in region

Site notes
- Public access: Yes, park and museum

The Kōjindani Site (荒神谷遺跡, Kōjindani iseki) is an archaeological site consisting of the remains of a Yayoi period ritual site located in the Hikawa-cho neighborhood of the city of Izumo, Shimane Prefecture in the San'in region of Japan. The site was designated a National Historic Site of Japan in 1987.

== Overview ==
Kōjindani Site is located on a steep south-facing slope at an elevation of 22 meters in a small valley northeast of Mount Bukkyo, which is 366 meters above sea level and is said to be the "Mount Kannabi" mentioned in the Izumo Fudoki. In 1983, during a survey associated with the construction of farm roads, a piece of Kofun period Sue ware earthenware was discovered on a path between paddy fields. Subsequent archaeological excavation found 358 bronze swords. The number of bronze swords excavated at this one site exceeded the total number of bronze swords from the Yayoi period unearthed all over Japan, and it attracted attention as evidence of the existence of a powerful force in the Izumo region. The bronze swords show no damage, so it is thought that it was buried relatively early after they were made, but the exact date or purpose of the burial is unknown. All 358 bronze swords were medium-slender, around 50 to 53 cm in length, and 500 grams in weight, and date from the late middle to early late Yayoi period. They were buried in four rows with the blade edge facing up, and with the point of the sword alternating. Most of them were engraved with an "X" mark. This is similar to the "X" mark engraved on a bronze dotaku excavated from the Kamoiwakura Site, about three kilometers away. Based on the distribution of bronze swords of this type, it is likely that they were made in Izumo, but since no molds have been found, it is likely that they were not made at this location. However, as the swords are all to the same design, it is certain that they were all made at the same location.

Following discovery of the swords, the Shimane Prefectural Board of Education determined that there was a high possibility that there were more unexcavated artifacts and ruins in the area. When the surrounds were investigated using a magnetic probe, six 20-cm bronze dotaku were discovered about seven meters deeper into the valley. They were lined up in two rows with their locks facing each other in the center of a pit. The date of burial of the dotaku is unknown as there are no accompanying remains, but based on the design, it was thought that they were produced in the Kinai region from the end of the middle Yayoi period to the late early period. However, with the discovery of the 39 dotaku at the Kamoiwakura Site it was decided that they place of manufacture may have been either northern Kyushu, or else locally in Izumo. One of the dotaku was identical to one found at a site in Tokushima Prefecture, and another is identical to one excavated from the Umegahata site in Ukyo-ku, Kyoto.

Furthermore, 16 bronze spears were buried on the east side of the same burial pit as the dotaku, with their blades raised up and their tips alternating. Next to them were small bronze dotaku lying with their fins upright, also arranged in alternating rows. It is thought that these spears were manufactured around the same time as the bronze swords, or slightly later. Judging from their shape and decorations, it appears that all 16 pieces were made in northern Kyushu.

The excavated bronze artifacts were all designated collectively as a National Treasure in 1998. The ruins have been preserved as a historic park with the adjacent Kojindani Museum occasionally exhibiting excavated items.

The site is approximately five minutes by car from Shobara Station on the JR West San'in Main Line.

== See also ==
- List of Historic Sites of Japan (Shimane)
