= Shimane Museum of Ancient Izumo =

Coordinates: 35°23′55.5″N 132°41′19.4″E

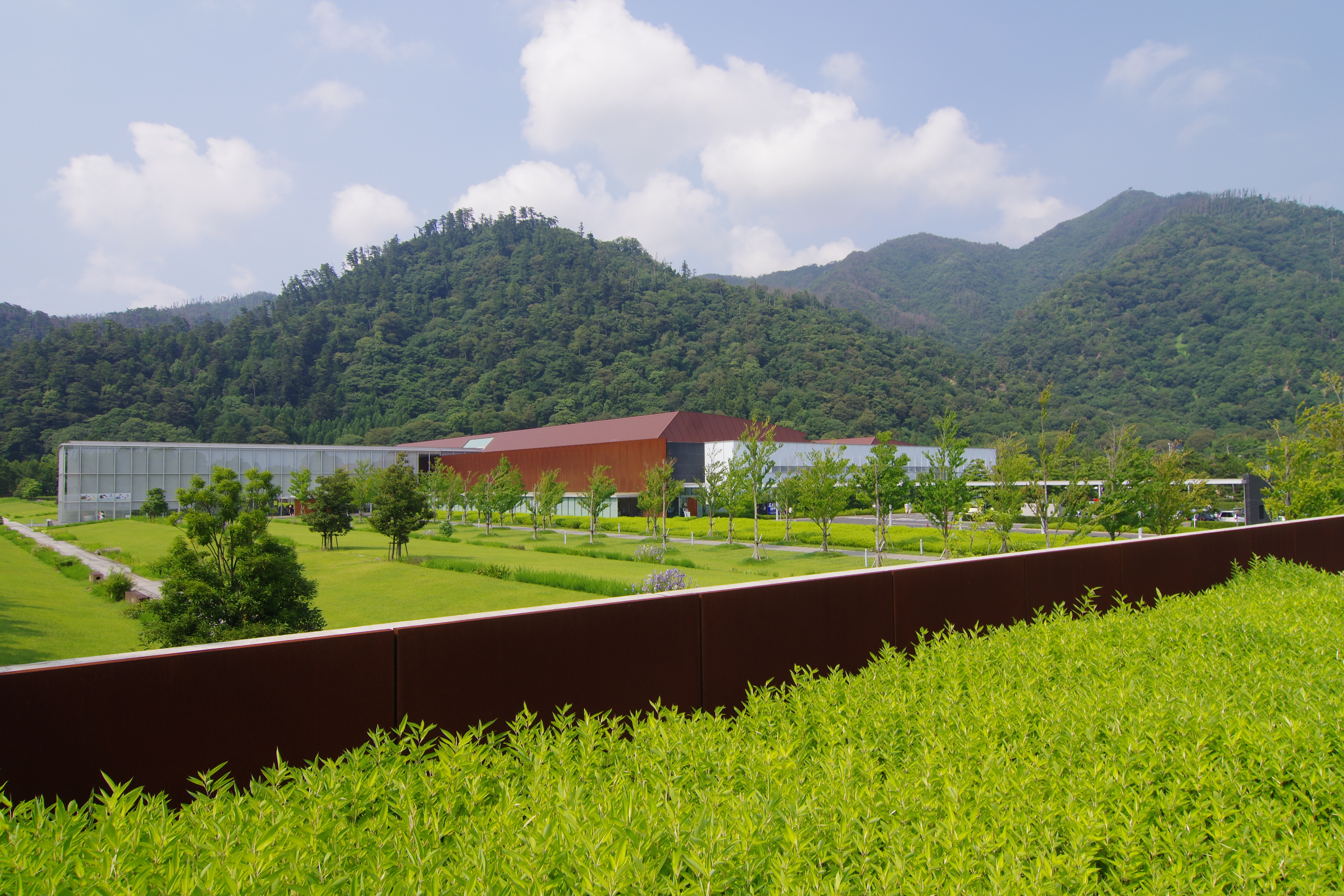
Shimane Museum of Ancient Izumo

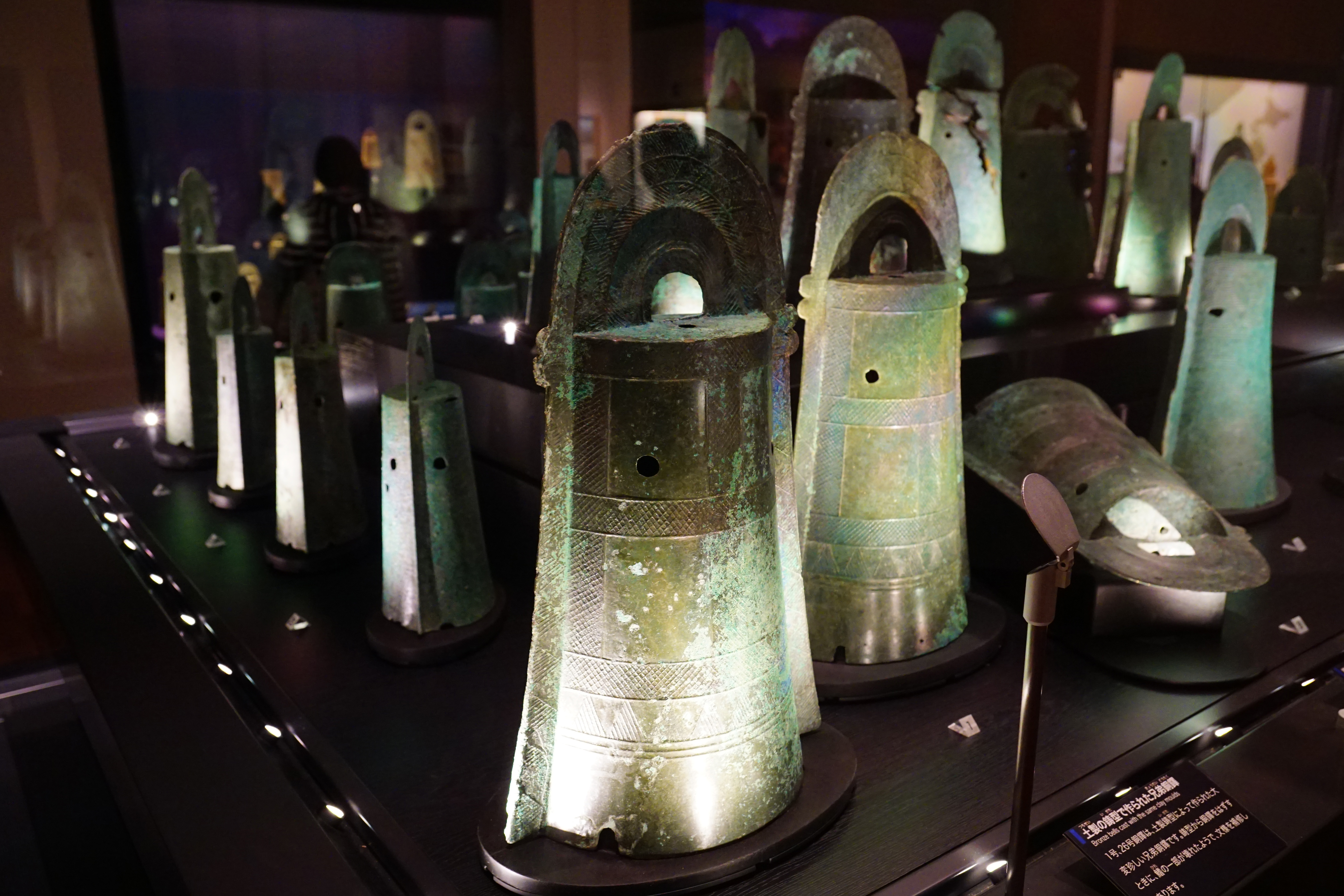
Dōtaku unearthed from Kamoiwakura remains (National Treasure of Japan)

The Shimane Museum of Ancient Izumo (島根県立古代出雲歴史博物館, Shimane kenritsu kodai Izumo rekishi hakubutsukan) opened in Izumo, Shimane Prefecture, Japan in 2007.

The design, by architect Fumihiko Maki, references the locally-important tatara steel; construction was completed in March 2006.

The permanent collection focuses on Izumo-taisha, Izumo Fudoki, and bronze artifacts of the Kofun period - including National Treasures from the Kojindani site - as well as the history of life in Shimane.

== See also ==
- Izumo-taisha
- List of National Treasures of Japan (archaeological materials)
