= Mount Kubote =

Mountain in Fukuoka Prefecture, Japan

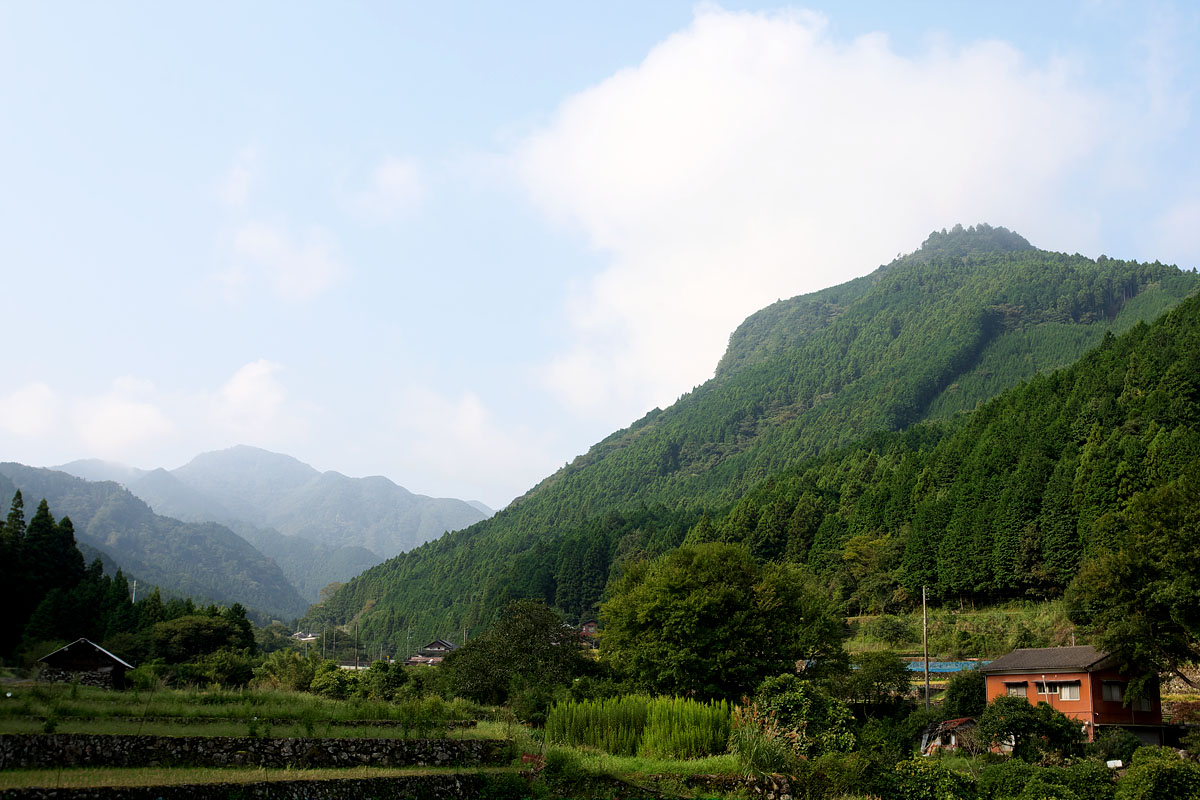
- Mount Kubote

Highest point
- Elevation: 782 m (2,566 ft)
- Coordinates: 33°32′24″N 131°00′42″E

Naming
- Native name: 求菩提山 (Japanese)

Geography
- Location within Fukuoka Prefecture Location within Japan
- Country: Japan
- State: Fukuoka Prefecture
- Region: Kyushu

Climbing
- Easiest route: Hiking
- National Historic Site of Japan

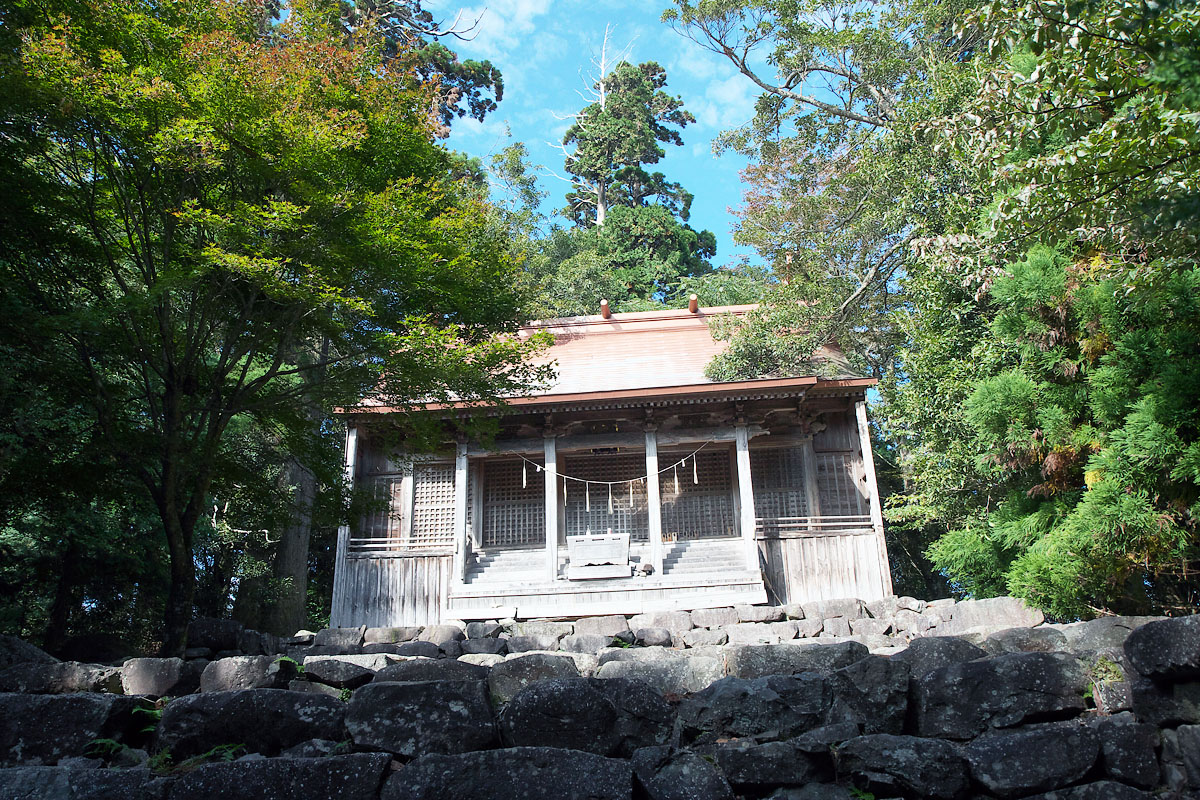
Kunitama Shrine at the summit of Mount Kubote

Mount Kubote (求菩提山, Kubotesan) is a mountain on the border of the city of Buzen and the town of Chikujō, in Fukuoka Prefecture, Japan. It is 782 metres (2,566 ft) in height. It is within the borders of the Yaba-Hita-Hikosan Quasi-National Park. Noted for its connections to the Shugendō mountain cult it was designated a National Historic Site of Japan in 2001.

== Overview ==
Mount Kubote, which has a hat-shaped profile, faces the Gulf of Suo on the Seto Inland Sea. It is the steepest mountain in the Chikushi Mountain Range. Although located in a volcanic area, the summit of the mountain is not a volcanic mountain itself, formed as a lava dome, but a butte-like topography formed by the erosion of andesitic lava from the early Pliocene era. The steep erosion has formed numerous monoliths with strange shapes, and many rock caves, both of which were attractive to the Shugendō cult.

Shugendō is a highly syncretic religion, a body of ascetic practices that originated in the Nara period having evolved during the 7th century from an amalgamation of beliefs, philosophies, doctrines and ritual systems drawn from local folk-religious practices, Shinto mountain worship and Buddhism. The final purpose of Shugendō is for practitioners to find supernatural power and save themselves and the masses by conducting religious training while treading through steep mountain ranges.

According to tradition, in 720 AD, a monk named Gyōzen built a shrine in the mountains as a dōjō on Mount Kubote, and this developed in the Heian period into a temple called Gokoku-ji Temple. During the Hōen era (1135–1141), a Tendai monk named Yorigon restored the temple. A copy of the Lotus Sutra on 33 copper plates was discovered in a cave on the mountain in the Taiei era (1521–1528) with his name and the date of October 21, 1142. The artifact is now a National Treasure and preserved at the Kyushu Historical Museum. The temple flourished as a center for Shugendō from the Heian period into the Muromachi period. The main temple complex was on the 8th station of the mountain, and at the top of the mountain there was a group of megaliths. Many sutra mounds have been found in archaeological excavations on the summit. Five main caves used for ascetic practices on the mountain have been confirmed, but records indicate many more once existed. There were also seven hamlets for monks, built with stonework carved into steps into the slope of the mountain. Shugendō gradually fell into decline during the Edo Period, and was banned by the Meiji government in 1870 with its Shinbutsu bunri edict separating Shinto from Buddhism.

At present, there is a Shinto shrine at the summit, reached by a climb of 850 stone steps, and a museum and campsite at the foot of the mountain.

== See also ==
- List of Historic Sites of Japan (Fukuoka)
