= Erewhon (store) =

American upscale grocery chain

- Erewhon logo

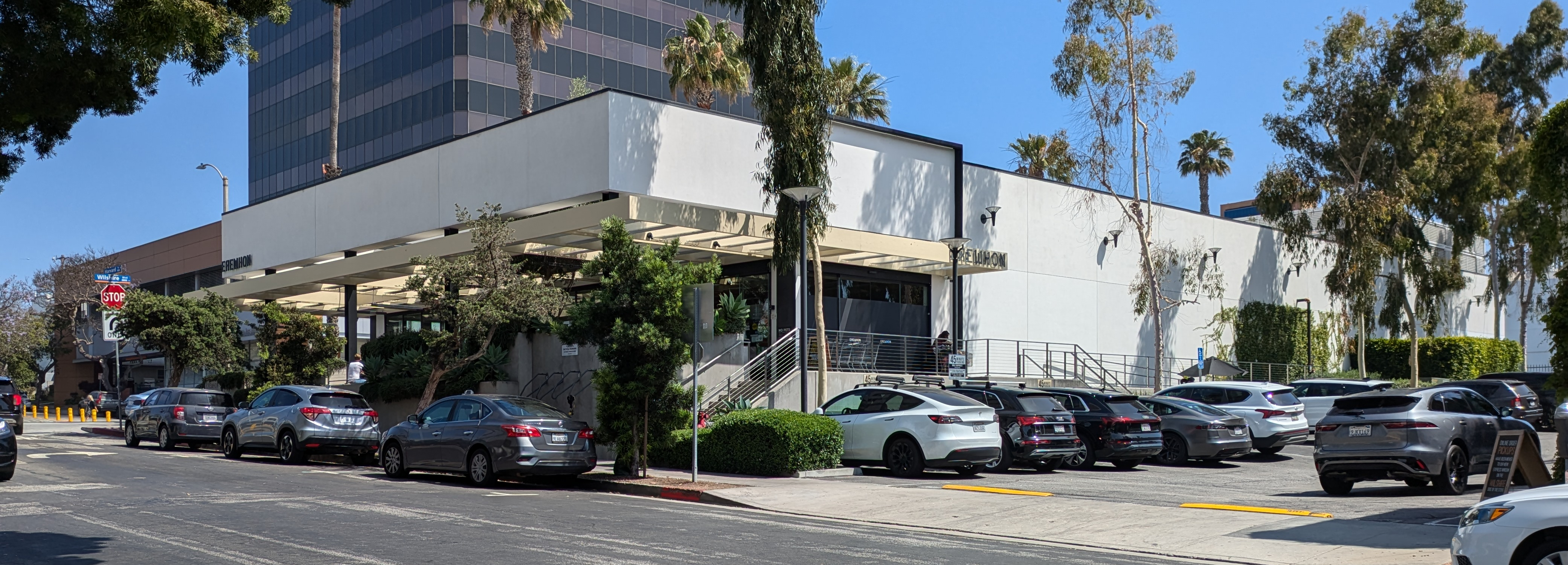
- Erewhon in Santa Monica
- Type: Privately held company
- Industry: Grocery store; Health food store
- Founded: 1966; 60 years ago (as part of Erewhon Organic)
- Founders: Michio Kushi; Aveline Kushi
- Headquarters: Los Angeles, California, United States
- Number of locations: 14 stores + 2 standalone cafes
- Areas served: Los Angeles County, California
- Key people: Tony Antoci (CEO); Josephine Antoci (President); Vito Antoci (Executive Vice President)
- Number of employees: approx. 2500
- Website: ship.erewhon.com

Erewhon (/ˈɛr.ɛ.hwɒn/, ERR-eh-hwon) is an American upscale grocery chain with 14 locations, all in the Greater Los Angeles area.

== History ==
Erewhon was founded in Boston, Massachusetts, in 1966 by Michio and Aveline Kushi, who were followers of the macrobiotic diet movement. The name "Erewhon" is derived from the 1872 satirical novel Erewhon by Samuel Butler. In the novel, Erewhon, an anagram of "nowhere", is a utopia in which individuals are responsible for their own health and prosecuted for the crime of being unhealthy.

The Erewhon Organic brand was originally a health foods producer with a single store in Boston. The Kushis moved to Los Angeles and opened Erewhon's oldest operating location, in the Fairfax District, in 1969. In 1979, the brand was purchased from bankruptcy by employee Tom DeSilva. In 2011, Tony and Josephine Antoci purchased the Fairfax District store from the widow of Tom DeSilva. The Antocis created and developed the brand into an upscale supermarket. The brand has been compared to the early years of Whole Foods Market.

Following several years of increasing financial performance, New York–based private equity firm Stripes Group purchased a substantial minority stake in Erewhon in 2019. In June 2021, Erewhon became a certified B Corporation.

As of 2023, Erewhon ships nationwide to all 50 states, as well as Australia, Canada, and the UK.

In 2024, Erewhon filed an environmental lawsuit to block the construction of a mixed-use development which would include 520 apartments (78 of which were subsidized affordable housing), ground floor retail and restaurants on the lot of the vacant Sportsmen's Lodge hotel near its Studio City location.

== Business model ==
Since the purchase by the Antoci's, Erewhon has sought to cultivate a young, affluent audience for its stores, presenting the stores as an aspirational, exclusive destination. Erewhon's clientele includes many celebrities. In addition to the relatively high prices of its products, Erewhon is known for stocking products appealing to wellness trends, as well as various dietary practices such as veganism. A key part of its offering is convenience, with a major part of the stores being dedicated to salad bars and drink/smoothie counters, making Erewhon function partly like a cafe in addition to a grocery store. Erewhon's products, which have cultivated a significant following on social media, are often only available for a short window of time.

== Locations ==
- Fairfax District (opened 1969)
- Calabasas (opened 2014)
- Venice (opened 2016)
- Santa Monica (opened 2018)
- Pacific Palisades (opened 2019)
- Silver Lake (opened 2020)
- Studio City (opened 2021)
- Beverly Hills (opened 2022)
- Culver City (opened 2023)
- Pasadena (opened 2023)
- Manhattan Beach (opened 2025)
- Kith Ivy, New York City (tonic bar only, opened 2025)
- West Hollywood (opened 2026)
- Los Angeles County Museum of Art (cafe and tonic bar only, opened 2026)
- Glendale (opened 2026)
- Thousand Oaks (opened 2026)

=== Upcoming locations ===
Locations in Costa Mesa and Downtown Los Angeles are scheduled to open in 2027.

== See also ==
- Bristol Farms
- Gelson's
- Erewhon Organic
