= Philicon Valley =

Tech hub

Coordinates: 40.083°N 75.449°W

Philicon Valley is a neologism for Philadelphia's version of Silicon Valley. Forbes coined the term on November 17, 1999 to refer specifically to the suburbs of Valley Forge and Wayne, Pennsylvania, which was also referred to as "Silicon Valley Forge" and "E-Valley Forge." In the Philadelphia metropolitan area, many "... new-economy companies have located themselves in the suburbs along Route 202..." due to the high tax base in the city of Philadelphia. From a marketing perspective, the term has been used by Internet companies to lure potential employees in the tech sector, that markets the firm as part of a large community of like companies in a suburb of Philadelphia. "Pennsylvania Dutch Country is only about a 90 minute drive away..." noting that the area is home to "... large high-tech companies..." The lure in the region has many Penn graduates, as well as other graduates do not consider Philadelphia to be the "hot spot" and some have chosen this region as an alternative. A briefing on the region, says the area contributes to Pennsylvania being ranked eighth in hi tech employing more than 170,000 according to the Ben Franklin Technology Partners of Southeastern Pennsylvania, WHYY-TV, and the Council for Urban Economic Development.

== Notable firms ==
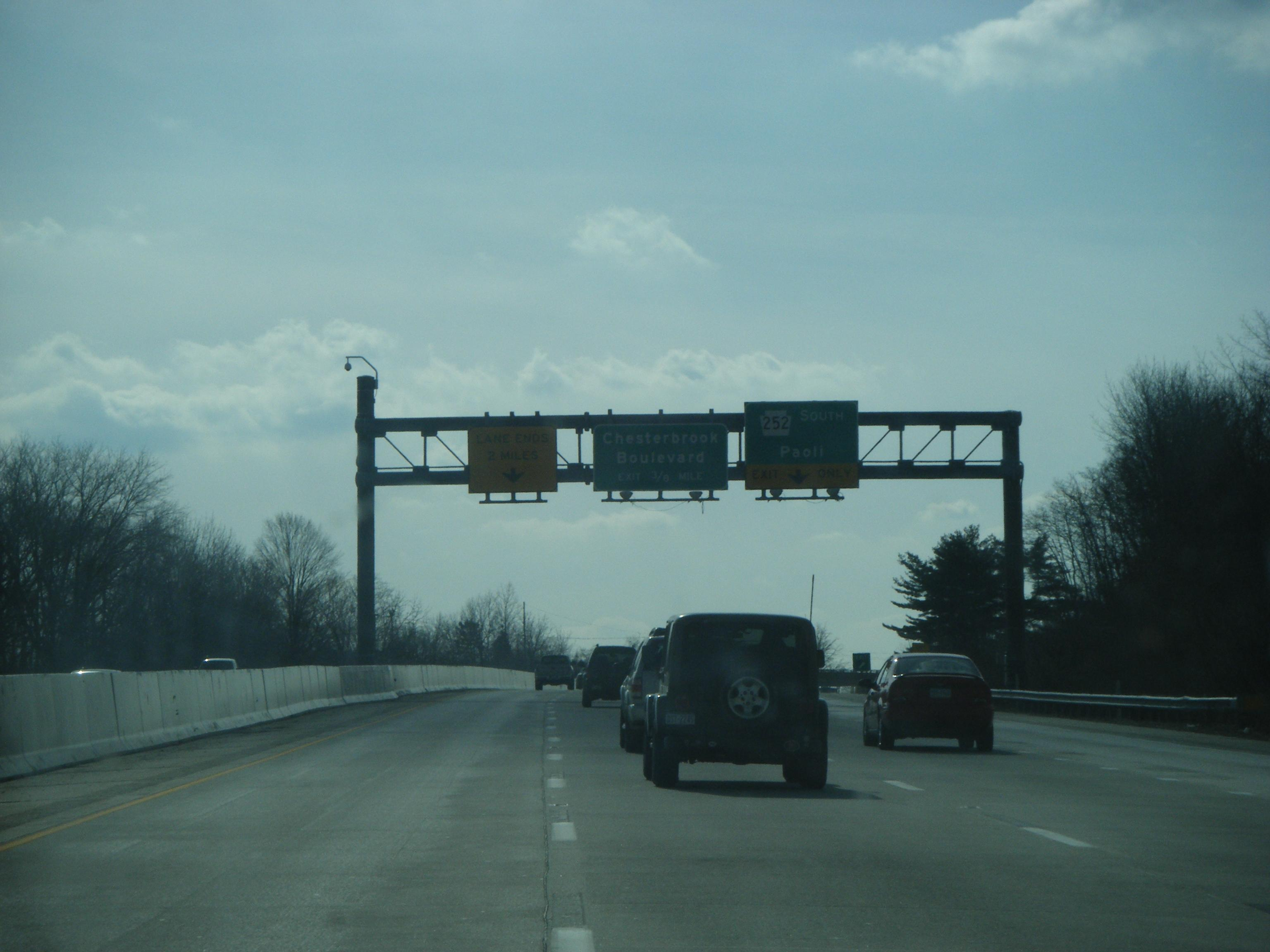
US 202 runs through the region known as "Philicon Valley"

According to the same Forbes article, the firms that had a presence in this region specialized in business-to-business partnerships.

- Safeguard Scientifics
- Novell
- Cambridge Technology Partners
- VerticalNet
- Internet Capital Group
- Comcast

Other notable companies that "put the region on the map" specialized in "entrepreneurialism" included:

- General Instrument
- Motorola
- WorldGate
- CDNow
- RCN

Philicon Valley Today

- Bentley Systems
- Checkpoint Systems
- Clarivate
- DuckDuckGo
- Fiserv
- GSI Commerce
- Gopuff
- Radial, Inc.
- Radian Group
- Ricoh (formerly Ikon Office Solutions)
- SAP
- Unisys
- Vishay Intertechnology

== See also ==
- Avenue of Technology (Philadelphia)
