= Aveline Kushi =

Japanese author (1923–2001)

- Born: Tomoko Yokoyama; 27 February 1923; Yokota, Japan
- Died: 23 July 2001 (aged 78); Brookline, Massachusetts, U.S.
- Education: University of Illinois; Columbia University
- Spouse: Michio Kushi (m. 1954)
- Children: 5

Aveline Kushi (born Tomoko Yokoyama; February 27, 1923 – July 23, 2001) was a Japanese teacher who was an advocate for macrobiotic diets and world peace. She opened Erewhon, considered the first natural food store, in Brookline, Massachusetts, in the early 1960s. Kushi promoted the macrobiotic philosophy and diet, a Taoist-influenced spiritual practice emphasizing organic and seasonal foods.

== Background ==
Kushi was born in Yokota, Japan. She worked as a school teacher until the end of World War II, when she joined noted macrobiotic activist George Ohsawa's World Government Association and changed her name to Aveline. Kushi moved to the United States on behalf of the group in 1951, and studied at the University of Illinois and Columbia University. Kushi married fellow macrobiotic advocate Michio Kushi in 1954.

== Career ==
Together, Aveline and Michio Kushi moved to Boston, where Aveline opened a health food store, Erehwon, among the first in the nation. The store soon expanded to Los Angeles, and Kushi sold the company in 1983. Aveline also wrote cookbooks, such as Aveline Kushi's Complete Guide to Macrobiotic Cooking for Health, Harmony and Peace in 1985 and The Changing Seasons Cookbook in 1987.

== Illness and death ==
Kushi was diagnosed with cervical cancer in 1992. Initially, this was treated with chemotherapy, but Kushi shifted to acupuncture and eastern remedies after being told she had reached the limit of traditional therapies. She died of the disease in 2001.

== Legacy ==
Aveline and Michio Kushi founded the Kushi Foundation, the Kushi Institute and One Peaceful World organizations, all dedicated to the promotion of a macrobiotic philosophy. The Kushi Institute was founded in 1978 to teach macrobiotics. It operates in Becket, Massachusetts, and Amsterdam.
