= Edward Esko =

American macrobiotic diet advocate (1950–2021)

Edward Esko (October 16, 1950 – December 11, 2021) was an American advocate of macrobiotics. He lectured all over the world on diet, nutrition, holistic health, food and oriental cosmology.

== Background ==
Esko was born in Philadelphia, to Edward and Elizabeth Esko. He was educated at Abraham Lincoln High School and Temple University. In 1972, Esko began studies in Boston with macrobiotic educator, Michio Kushi. He served as executive director of Kushi's East West Foundation and Director of Education at the Kushi Institute.

He was the founder of the International Macrobiotic Institute (IMI) and served on the Board of Planetary Health, Inc., the non-profit sponsor of the Macrobiotic Summer Conference.

Esko has authored or edited over two-dozen books, and co-authored Macrobiotic Cooking for Everyone with his first wife, Wendy Esko. He lived in Pittsfield, Massachusetts with Naomi Ichikawa, his second wife and also a teacher of macrobiotics. Esko died aged 71 in Pittsfield.

== Achievements ==
- 1973: Esko received an Author Award from the George Ohsawa Macrobiotic Foundation for a review of Two Great Indians in Japan by George Ohsawa.
- 1999: The Smithsonian Institution's National Museum of American History opened a permanent collection on macrobiotics and alternative health care. The collection, titled “Michio and Aveline Kushi Macrobiotics Collection”, includes numerous books and articles written or edited by Edward Esko. It is located in the Archives Center.
- 2002: Edward Esko joined the Preventive Medicine Center in Hartford, Connecticut as Director of Educational Services.
- 2017: Edward Esko founded the International Macrobiotic Institute to continue the work of Michio Kushi and George Ohsawa.
- 2017: Esko co-founded the Macrobiotic Summer Conference in 2017 at Eastover Resort in Lenox, Massachusetts.

== Books ==
- 1979 Natural Healing through Macrobiotics (with Michio Kushi). Japan Publications; ISBN 9780870404573
- 1980 Macrobiotic Cooking for Everyone. Japan Publications; ISBN 9780870404696
- 1986 Macrobiotic Child Care and Family Health (with Michio Kushi). Japan Publications; ISBN 9780870406126
- 1988 Doctors Look at Macrobiotics (edited). Japan Publications; ISBN 0870406868
- 1991 The Macrobiotic Approach to Cancer (with Michio Kushi). Garden City Park. ISBN 9780895294869
- 1992 Heilung des Planeten Erde. Ost West Bund Verlag; ISBN 3924724423
- 1993 Holistic Health through Macrobiotics (with Michio Kushi). Japan Publications; ISBN 9780870408953
- 2012 Contemporary Macrobiotics. Amberwaves Press; ISBN 9780970891389
- 2012 Yin Yang Primer. Amberwaves Press; ISBN 9781477645604
- 2014 Rice Field Essays. Amberwaves Press; ISBN 9781502717696
- 2016 Dandelion Essays. Amberwaves Press; ISBN 9781502472816
- 2017 One Peaceful Universe. IMI Press; ISBN 9781543158939
- 2017 Macrobiotics. IMI Press; ISBN 9781979102070
- 2017 What is Macrobiotics? IMI Press; ISBN 9781981241040
- 2017 Macrobiotics: Food for Peace. IMI Press ISBN 9781979044486
- 2018 Macrobiotic Nutrition. IMI Press; ISBN 9781721970070
- 2018 Baseball Feng Shui. IMI Press; ISBN 9781729648391
