= Erewhon Organic =

Defunct cereal brand owned by Post Foods

- Formerly: Erewhon Trading Co.
- Industry: Food
- Founded: 1966; 60 years ago
- Founders: Aveline Kushi; Michio Kushi
- Defunct: 2019; 7 years ago
- Fate: Brand discontinued in 2019, replaced by "Three Sisters Foods"
- Successor: Three Sisters Foods
- Products: Breakfast cereals
- Parent: Attune Foods (2009–13); Post Foods (2013–19)
- Subsidiaries: U.S. Mills

Erewhon Organic (/ˈɛr.ɛ.hwɒn/, ERR-eh-hwon) was an organic cereal brand, and later, a subsidiary of Post Foods. It was known for their allergy-friendly line of organic cereals sold by health food stores across North America, and for being one of the first companies to market macrobiotic, organic whole foods in the United States. In 2019, the Erewhon Organic brand was discontinued by its parent company Post Foods, and replaced by Three Sisters Foods, which sells a similar product line of organic cereals.

"Erewhon" is derived from the 1872 satirical novel Erewhon by Samuel Butler. In the novel, Erewhon (an anagram of “nowhere”) is a utopia in which individuals are responsible for their own health.

== History ==
Since the early 1950s, married couple Aveline Kushi and Michio Kushi had been introducing modern macrobiotics into the United States from Japan.

They were both students of George Ohsawa, the founder of the modern macrobiotic movement, since after World War II. In the late 1960s, the Kushis began forming study groups in New York and later in Massachusetts in which they lectured on wide-ranging topics, from philosophy and spiritualism, to healthy diet and disease prevention. Their following began to increase, and as word spread, they decided to open a store to meet the ever-growing demand for macrobiotic and whole foods products. Erewhon's first product line consisted of processed soy products, including miso and shoyu purchased from Howard Rower's Infinity Foods and Japan Foods Corp., both in New York.

The Kushis soon realized that the quality of food needed was not available in the United States. When Michio Kushi discussed his difficulties with an old university friend, his friend remembered a former schoolmate who was now in the import and export business. He thought his business friend in Tokyo, Japan, might be able to help: Akiyoshi Kazama, the founder of Mitoku.

In August 1967, environmentalist and entrepreneur Paul Hawken took over the management of Erewhon, changed the name to Erewhon Trading Co., and began to expand the business. By the early 1970s, Erewhon began contracting with farmers to produce organically grown crops. By 1973 it had established and contracted with 57 farms in 35 states. It also became one of the first companies to establish a “Charter of Quality Standards for Natural Products” for their product line.

By 1979, Erewhon's rapid growth stretched its cash flow and financing capacity and the company began experiencing financial difficulties. The business expanded until it included 4,000 products, servicing 2,000 customers by February 1981. As these troubles worsened, many supplier companies stopped shipping to the Boston firm. Because of a deep personal commitment to the Kushis, Kazama continued to fill orders. When Erewhon finally filed for bankruptcy in November 1981, Mitoku was its largest creditor and took a $300,000 loss.

After a series of setbacks during the ensuing years, Erewhon celebrated its resurgence by acquiring U.S. Mills in 1986. U.S. Mills, which was founded in 1908, effectively merged with Erewhon as their line of whole grain cereals and simple manufacturing methods were consistent with Erewhon's.

In 2009, San Francisco-based health foods company Attune Foods acquired U.S. Mills continuing the mission of promoting digestive health through pure ingredients and simple manufacturing processes. In 2013, Attune Foods was purchased by Post Foods. The Erewhon brand featured eight organic cereals including six gluten free cereals under the Attune Foods banner.

== See also ==
- Kashi
- Erewhon (store)
- Bear Naked
- Cascadian Farms
- Nestle Fitness
- Special K
