= U.S. Mills =

American packaged food products company

- Type: Private
- Founded: 1908; 118 years ago
- Headquarters: Needham, Massachusetts
- Brands: Uncle Sam Cereal; Erewhon; New Morning; Farina Skinner's Raisin Bran
- Website: www.attunefoods.com

U.S. Mills is an American packaged food products company specializing in natural, organic, and specialty cereals, cookies, and crackers. Their products are sold through supermarkets, wholesale grocers, and natural food distributors nationwide. Their brands include Uncle Sam Cereal, Erewhon, New Morning, Skinner's Raisin Bran, and, formerly, Farina.

== History ==
U.S. Mills was founded in 1908, with the introduction of Uncle Sam Cereal. In 1926, the company introduced Skinner's Raisin Bran, which is claimed to be America's first raisin bran.

Meanwhile, the Erewhon Natural Foods Market was founded in 1966 by Aveline and Michio Kushi, with an emphasis on organically-grown produce and macrobiotics. In 1986, Erewhon acquired U.S. Mills, choosing to adopt "U.S. Mills" as the new company name.

In 2000, the company acquired New Morning, a packaged natural foods distributor and the first company to introduce natural versions of children's cereals.

In 2001, U.S. Mills acquired the Farina brand from Holden Foods. Farina was originally a Pillsbury product, introduced in 1898. In 2009, U.S. Mills sold Farina to Malt-O-Meal.

On December 14, 2009, U.S. Mills, Inc. was acquired by Attune Foods. Four brands are referenced under the Attune Foods banner: Erewhon, Uncle Sam, New Morning, and Skinner's.

== See also ==
- List of food companies
