= Attune (disambiguation) =

Attune is a 2017 album by the Australian singer Lenka.

Attune may also refer to:

- Musical tuning, concepts related to pitch and tone
- Attunement, early term for "energy medicine", per Lloyd Arthur Meeker (1907–1954)
- Attunement (German: Stimmung), the third class of experience ranked beneath will and reason per Heidegger
- Attune Foods (est 1908), makers of cereals and the probiotic Attune bar
- Attune, insurance company, subsidiary of AIG
- Attune, consultancy, fashion industry subsidiary of MAS Holdings and SAP
- Attune, horse which won Fleur De Lys Fillies' Stakes in 2004
