= Buck Buckley =

American tech executive

- Born: Walter White Buckley III; 1960 (age 65–66)
- Education: University of North Carolina at Chapel Hill
- Known for: Co-founder and CIO of Semcap

Buck Buckley is the co-founder and CIO of SEMCAP and former CEO of Actua Corporation, formerly ICG Corporation, a company that he co-founded along with Ken Fox. In 2017, Actua Corporation announced the sale of its majority-owned assets and that it would return 3x capital to shareholders.

== Early life and education ==
Buckley grew up in Devon, Pennsylvania, and attended Episcopal Academy through high school. He then attended University of North Carolina at Chapel Hill, graduating with a Bachelor of Arts in political science. While in college, Buckley starred on the North Carolina soccer team. He was First Team all ACC and All South for UNC. His coach, legendary Anson Dorrance recalled "He played with wonderful, physical, reckless abandon", leaving it all on the field.

== Currently ==
Buckley and Cyrus Vandrevala co-founded Semcap in 2020. SEMCAP is a growth impact manager investing in AI, food, and healthcare companies. The company has made investments in companies including ALOHA, Arcana, FreshPrep], Purely Elizabeth, Good Culture, Lula Commerce, NeuroFlow, Overwatch Imaging, SafeinHome, and SafeRide Health.

Buckley co-founded Primary Source Media, an audio and film production company specializing in historical content. Buckley is the co-founder and executive chair of Primary Source Media.

== Earlier in his career ==
In 1988, Buckley joined Safeguard Scientifics, a venture capital firm. From 1991 to 1996, Buckley was the Vice President of Acquisitions at Safeguard. There, he oversaw the acquisitions of a number of companies including ChromoVision, Diamond Technology, Video Server, and XL Vision.

=== Internet Capital Group ===
Buckley and fellow Safeguard executive Ken Fox noticed an emerging market in e-commerce business-to-business and left Safeguard in February 1996 to found a venture capital firm, Internet Capital Group (later shortened to ICG). They asked Safeguard head Pete Musser for $5 million in funding, but he insisted on investing $15 million. Buckley and Fox raised $40 million to start ICG, twice what they wanted. In addition to Safeguard, major investors included Comcast, Compaq, and BancBoston Ventures.

Buckley served as the CEO and president of the company from March 1996 to December 2001, at which time he became the company's Chairman. ICG invested $1.4 billion in 61 start-up firms; and an article declared that "Buckley put B2B on the map".

In August 1999, the company became a public company via an initial public offering, offering stock for sale at $12 per share. By December 1999, the stock was trading at over $200 per share and Buckley's stake of 10,000,000 shares, or 3.5% of the company, was worth over $2 billion. By November 2000, the stock was down to $11 per share and after the September 11 attacks it traded for 20 cents per share. Buckley sold very little of his stock and remained optimistic.

After ICG survived the crash, paid down the debt and changed its business model to move towards an operating model. Instead of taking small stakes in many companies, it invested in a few "core" companies at a time, as a majority owner. This allowed the company to have much greater control over the operations of its investments. Buckley refocused the company to find strategic partnerships with traditional industry leaders such as a joint venture with DuPont called CapSpan in early 2000. In September 2014, when the company changed its name to Actua Corporation, its stock was trading around $6 per share and was worth approximately $200 million. At its closing, Actua distributed close to $18/share and provided a triple return to investors.

=== Other affiliations ===
Buckley serves on the Board of Directors for Philadelphia based FS Investments, a $34+ billion asset manager. He is a director of several technology startups including Critical Alert, Diagnostic Biochips, Dropps, Margaux and Desten. He is on the advisory boards of the Carolina Entrepreneurial Initiative, the UNC Kenan–Flagler Business School, the Vetri Community Partnership and Starfinder Foundation. Previously, he was a director of Breakaway Solutions, Channel Intelligence, Familywyze, ICG Commerce and VerticalNet .

Buckley is known for a "coach-like style" of management that encourages teamwork and camaraderie.

== Recognition ==
In 2000, Buckley was named the Entrepreneur of the Year by Price Waterhouse, and received the Entrepreneurial Excellence Award from the Greater Philadelphia Venture Group.

== Political involvement ==
Buckley was a major donor to Florida Governor Ron DeSantis's 2022 re-election campaign. During the 2024 presidential election, Buckley contributed over $500,000 to the campaign of Chris Christie.

== Personal life ==
Buckley is an avid runner, often traversing a long, rocky hill near the SEMCAP headquarters at Valley Forge National Historical Park. Buckley has two children.
