= Ken Fox =

American entrepreneur and investor

- Born: Kenneth Allen Fox; August 3, 1970 (age 56); Philadelphia, Pennsylvania, U.S.
- Education: Pennsylvania State University (B.S., 1993)
- Occupation: Founder of Stripes, LLC

Kenneth Allen Fox (born August 3, 1970) is an American entrepreneur and investor. He co-founded Internet Capital Group in 1996 and founded the growth equity firm Stripes in 2008.

== Early life and education ==
Fox grew up in the suburbs of Philadelphia, Pennsylvania. His father owned a manufacturing company and encouraged Fox to be an entrepreneur. At the age of 15, Fox started his first business, a driveway snow removal service, by purchasing a $600 snowblower with a friend. At age 18, he worked for his father, identifying acquisition opportunities.

In 1993, he graduated from Pennsylvania State University with a B.S. in economics. In 2000, he led the formation of The Fox Challenge at Pennsylvania State University, a university-wide business plan competition with cash prizes sponsored by Fox and the university.

== Career ==
After graduating, Fox worked briefly for Goldman Sachs. In 1994, he joined Safeguard Scientifics as the director of West Coast operations, reporting to Pete Musser. In 1996, he left Safeguard, along with co-worker Buck Buckley and founded Internet Capital Group (later Actua Corporation).

The company held an initial public offering in August 1999 and soared in value by the end of the year as part of the dot-com bubble, making Fox a billionaire on paper.

In 2007, Fox co-founded A10 Capital, specializing in middle-market commercial real estate lending. He resigned in 2018.

Fox was Chairman of Smartwool and NetQuote.

In 2008, Fox founded Stripes, a Manhattan-based growth equity firm that invests in enterprise and branded consumer products companies. Stripes invested in Monday, ON Running, A24, Island, Ramp, DataBricks, Spectro Cloud, Khaite, Erewhon, Snyk, Axonius, Fireblocks, and Pleo.

== Personal life ==
Fox is married to Ana Fox. In 2012, they purchased a historic 8-bedroom home in Southampton, New York for $10.7 million. In 2017, they announced plans to expand it to a 25-bedroom home.

Fox is a major donor to the TEAK Fellowship, which provides academic preparation for low-income students in New York City. He has also donated to Acumen.
