= Crumbl =

American cookie store chain

Crumbl, LLC
- Logo used since 28 November 2023

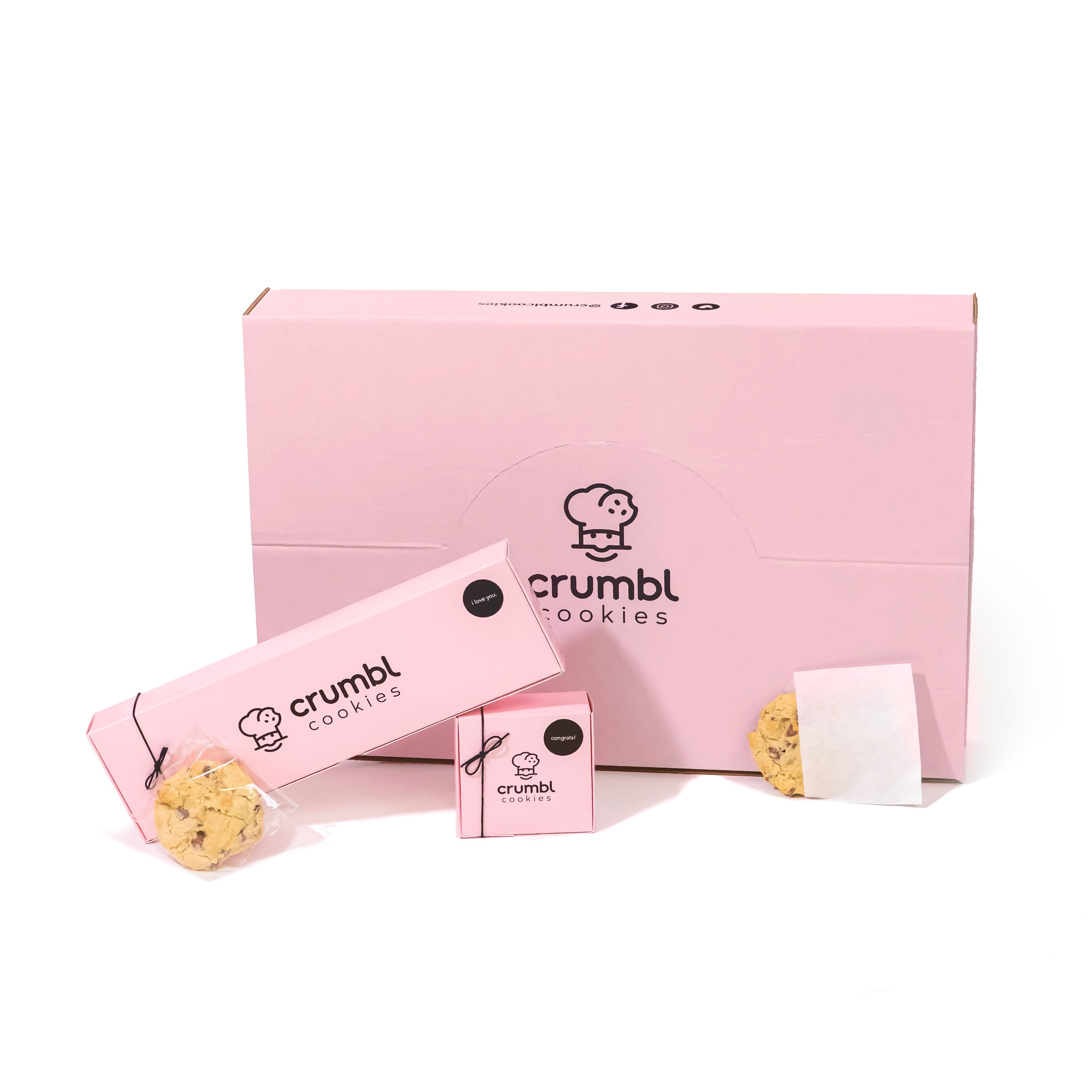
- Crumbl's pink box packaging
- Trade name: Crumbl
- Type: Private
- Industry: Franchising with bakeries
- Founded: September 29, 2017; 9 years ago
- Founders: Sawyer Hemsley; Jason McGowan
- Headquarters: Lindon, Utah, United States
- Number of locations: 1,071 stores (2024)
- Areas served: United States; Canada; Mexico
- Key people: Jason McGowan (CEO); Sawyer Hemsley (CBO); Graciela Chadwick (COO)
- Website: crumblcookies.com

Crumbl (stylized in all lowercase), previously branded as Crumbl Cookies, is an American multinational franchise chain of bakeries headquartered in Lindon, Utah, that specializes in cookies and other desserts like pies, brownies, and cakes.

== History ==
Crumbl was founded by cousins Sawyer Hemsley and Jason McGowan in 2017 while Hemsley attended Utah State University in Logan, Utah. The duo utilized A/B testing methods to come up with their milk chocolate chip cookie recipe. By 2020 the company had 90 locations.

Crumbl hired Graciela Chadwick, a former Chick-fil-A and KPMG executive, as chief operating officer in 2022. The company rebranded with a new logo, color scheme, and visual identity in 2024, after a 37% year-over-year drop in sales from 2022 to 2023, laid off 10% corporate employees, including Chadwick, and scaled back expansion plans. This is also when they began to introduce items other than cookies to the lineups. Seven locations closed in 2023, and fourteen more locations closed in 2024. The company reported having 1,071 stores in December 2024.

Bloomberg estimated their 2024 sales at $1.2 billion and profit around $91 million. The average store's annual net profit was over $250,000, but the median store's profit was under $80,000. In early 2025, the company was exploring a sale with a valuation near $2 billion, facilitated by North Point Mergers & Acquisitions. In May 2025 the company sold a stake to TSG Consumer Partners, and received $500 million in loans from Blackstone Inc. and Golub Capital.

Crumbl franchisees closed at least 57 locations in 2026, and at least 55 franchises were listed for sale. 20 stores have opened in 2026, and there are over 1000 stores. Sales are down 70% from two years prior per an internal company document, and placer.ai noted August 2026 foot traffic was down 32% year over year. The company laid off staff in October 2026. The company is not open on Sundays, nor do they use coffee as an ingredient due to the founders' Mormon upbringing.

== Products ==
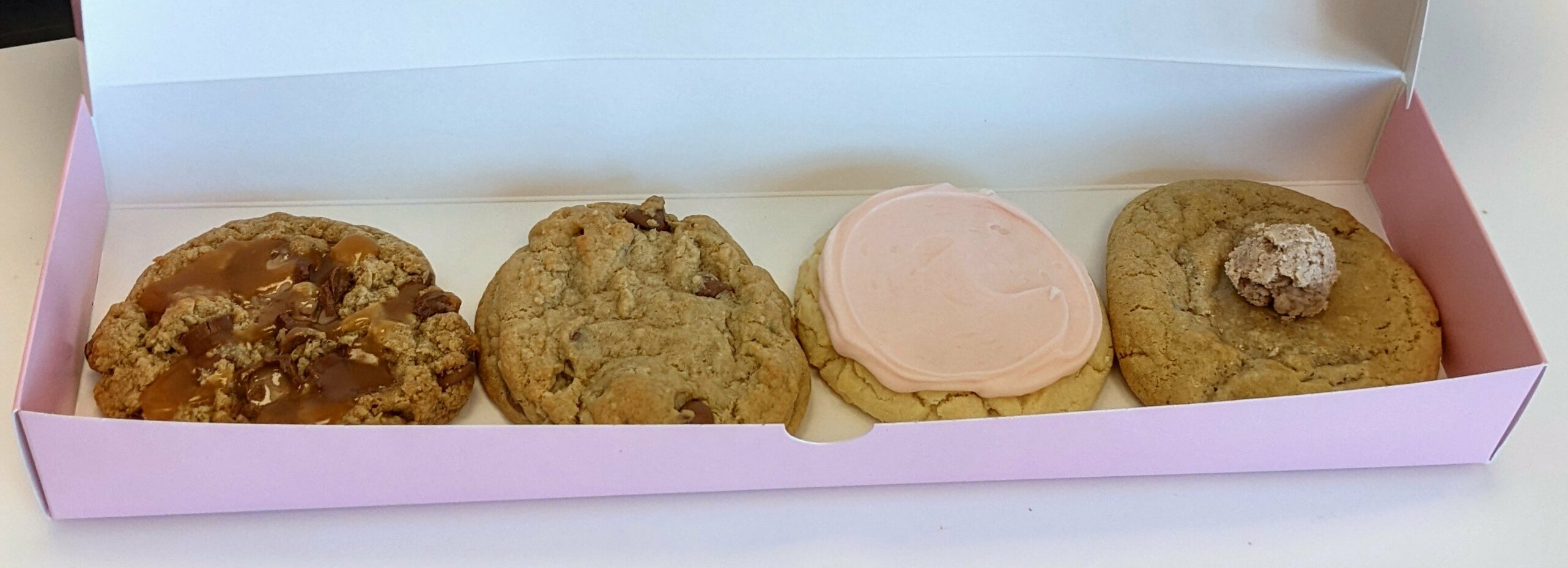
A four-pack of cookies from Crumbl.

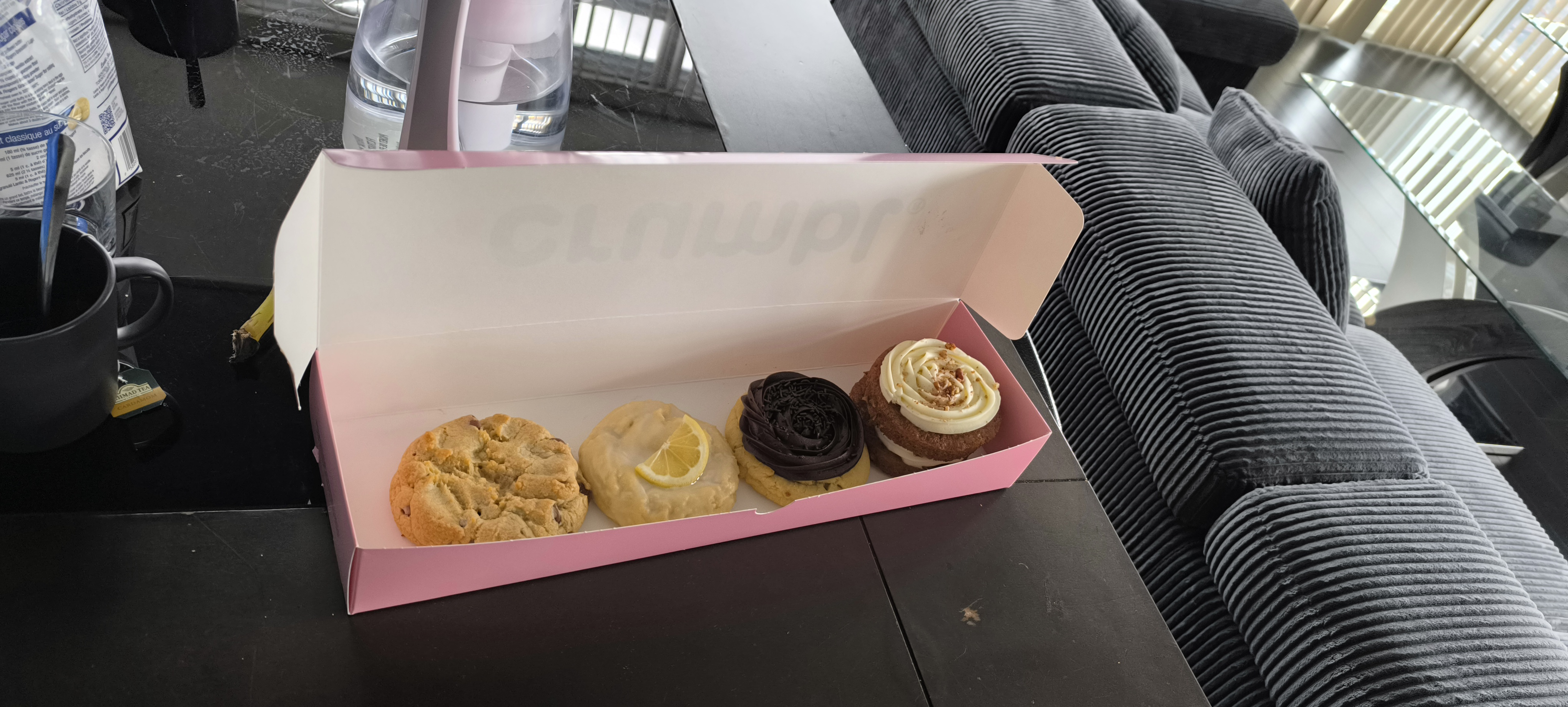
A box of Crumbl cookies bought at the Toronto location.

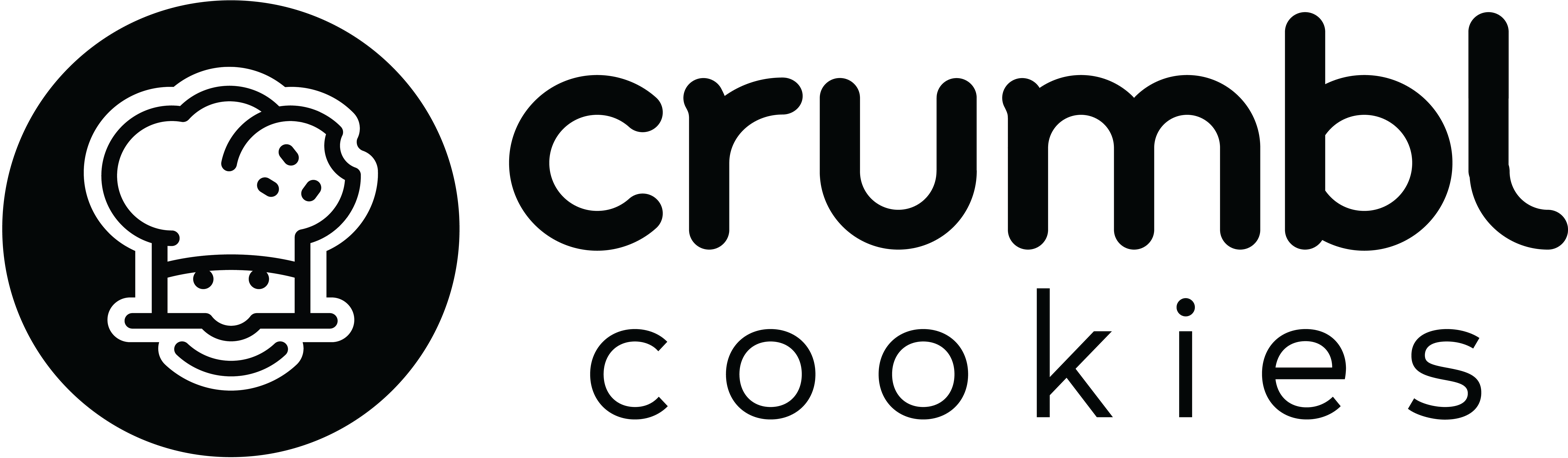
Logo used from 2020 – 2023.

Crumbl originally had a weekly rotating menu of six different cookie flavors, pulled from its library of hundreds of different flavors. However, in 2024, after the introduction of desserts other than cookies to their lineups, the lineup size began to change. Currently, Crumbl generally offers two "classic flavors" that do not rotate weekly and six "rotating flavors" on their menu.

Crumbl has taken action in a few cases where it alleged that its business practices were being infringed upon. Crumbl sued both Crave Cookies and Dirty Dough in 2022. The suit against Crave ended in a peaceful dismissal with both sides agreeing to drop claims in July 2023, while the dispute with Dirty Dough, involving trade secret theft allegations, resulted in a settlement in late 2023, where Dirty Dough agreed to return stolen info, though specific terms remain confidential and Crumbl's broader injunctions against Dirty Dough's franchising were denied. Separately, in 2024, unofficial Crumbl pop-up stores appeared in Australia, United Kingdom, and Mexico, but instead of pursuing legal action, the company announced it would speed up plans to open legitimate stores in those countries.

With its growth, the company has encountered some operational issues and challenges. In 2022, the U.S. Department of Labor fined eleven of its franchises a total of $57,854 for violations, for assigning underage employees to shifts that exceeded the permitted hours and to tasks involving "possible dangerous ovens and machinery". The parent company issued an apology and committed to taking corrective actions. In 2024, animal welfare organizations called on Crumbl to end its use of battery cage eggs, which company leaders responded they had no intention of doing. As a result, protests continued into 2025. The company later switched from shelled eggs to bagged eggs at some locations.

In 2025, Warner Music Group sued Crumbl for $24 million, alleging copyright infringement for use of their music catalog in Crumbl social media posts without permission. In June 2026, Crumbl announced its official expansion into Mexico, following its previous entry into Canada. The chain opened its first Mexican store on July 28, 2026, located on Durango Street in the Roma Norte neighborhood of Mexico City. The grand opening saw large crowds and long lines attributed to the brand's viral popularity on social media platforms like TikTok.

== See also ==
- Insomnia Cookies
- Levain Bakery
- PopUp Bagels
