= John Szwed =

American music scholar

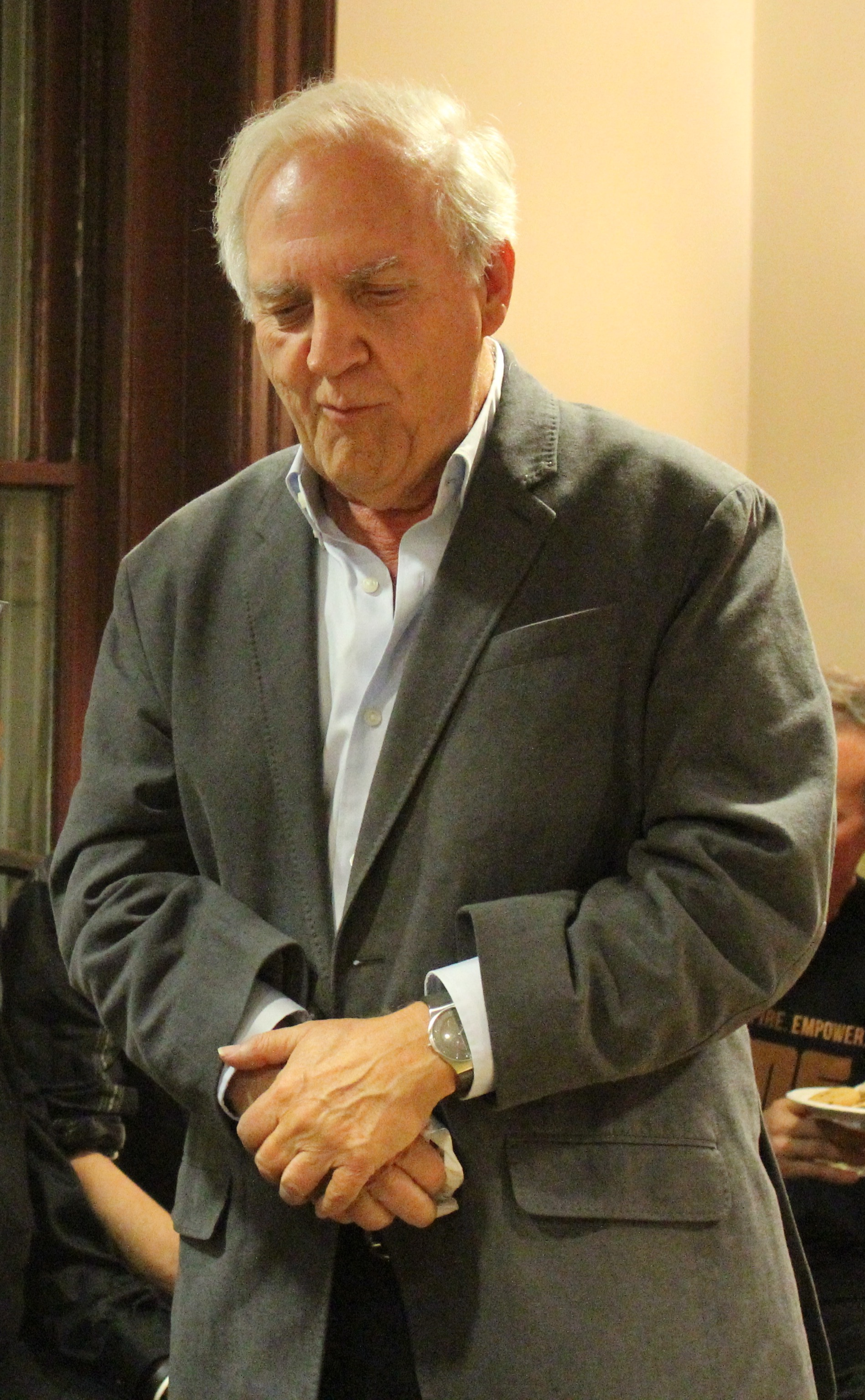
John Szwed at the Kelly Writers House in 2015

John F. Szwed (born 1936) is the John M. Musser Professor Emeritus of Anthropology, African American Studies and Film Studies at Yale University and an Adjunct Senior Research Scholar in the Center for Jazz Studies at Columbia University, where he previously served as the Center's Director and Professor of Music and Jazz Studies. Szwed is the author of many books on jazz and American music, including studies of Sun Ra, Miles Davis, Jelly Roll Morton, Alan Lomax, Billie Holiday and Harry Everett Smith.

== Career ==
Szwed received a B.S. in business administration and economics from Marietta College in 1958. He also studied trombone and music theory and played professionally for twelve years; as an undergraduate, he worked in a steel mill and performed at roadhouses, country clubs, college dances and speakeasies in Ohio and West Virginia. Thereafter, he enrolled at Ohio State University, where he earned a second bachelor's degree in communications in 1959, an M.A. in communications in 1960 and a Ph.D. in sociology and anthropology in 1965. His graduate school adviser was anthropology pioneer Erika Bourguignon, who encouraged him to bring to his work what he already knew and experienced. His work as an anthropologist and folklorist includes field studies in Newfoundland, the Georgia Sea Islands, and Trinidad.

From 1982 to 2008, Szwed was John M. Musser Professor of Anthropology, African American Studies and Film Studies at Yale University. Szwed was appointed term Professor of Music and Jazz Studies at Columbia University in 2008, a position he held through 2014. From 2011 to 2014, he was Director of the Center for Jazz Studies at Columbia. He has also taught at New York University and the University of Pennsylvania, where he was Director of the Center for Urban Ethnography and Chair of the Department of Folklore. Szwed is married to Marilyn Anderson Szwed and lives in Philadelphia, Pennsylvania.

== Publications ==
Szwed's study of Sun Ra, Space is the Place: The Lives and Times of Sun Ra, was published in 1997. A Miles Davis biography, So What: The Life of Miles Davis, followed in 2003. Szwed wrote Doctor Jazz, a booklet about Jelly Roll Morton for the 2005 issue of The Complete Library of Congress Recordings by Alan Lomax on Rounder Records. The booklet won the 2005 Grammy Award for Best Album Notes. In 2010, Szwed published a biography of Alan Lomax, the folklorist, ethnomusicologist, and field collector of folk music of the 20th century, entitled The Man Who Recorded the World.

In Billie Holiday: The Musician and the Myth (2015), Szwed analyses the art of Billie Holiday's singing and the construction of her life as a mythic paradigm of African American suffering. Szwed argues that Holiday's autobiography, Lady Sings the Blues, is a generally accurate account of Holiday's life, and that Holiday's co-writer, William Dufty, was forced to water down or suppress material by the threat of legal action. The New Yorker reviewer Richard Brody writes: "In particular, Szwed traces the stories of two important relationships that are missing from the book—with Charles Laughton, in the nineteen-thirties, and with Tallulah Bankhead, in the late nineteen-forties—and of one relationship that’s sharply diminished in the book, her affair with Orson Welles around the time of Citizen Kane."

== Bibliography ==
- Afro-American Anthropology: Contemporary Perspective on Theory and Research, ed. Norman Whitten & John Szwed, 1970, ISBN 978-0-02-935250-2
- Space is the Place: The Lives and Times of Sun Ra, 1997, ISBN 978-1-84195-055-6
- Jazz 101: A Complete Guide to Learning and Loving Jazz, 2000, ISBN 978-0-7868-8496-4
- So What: The Life of Miles Davis, 2002, ISBN 978-0-09-928183-2
- Doctor Jazz, Jelly Roll Morton, 2005, Rounder Records
- Crossovers: Essays on Race, Music, and American Culture, 2006, ISBN 978-0-8122-1972-2
- Alan Lomax: The Man Who Recorded the World, 2010, ISBN 978-0-14-312073-5
- Billie Holiday: The Musician & The Myth, 2015, ISBN 978-0670014729
- Cosmic Scholar: The Life and Times of Harry Smith, 2023, ISBN 978-0374282240
