= Sugar Blues =

1975 book by William Dufty

- First edition
- Author: William Dufty
- Language: English
- Genre: Non-fiction
- Publisher: Chilton Book Company
- Publication date: 1975

Sugar Blues is a book by William Dufty that was released in 1975 and has become a dietary classic. According to the publishers, over 1.6 million copies have been printed.

Dufty uses the narrative form to delve into the history of sugar and history of medicine. He mentions whistle blowers, such as Semmelweiss, to remind readers of the discontinuities in standard science.

He also delves into the history of Cuba, history of slavery, history of tobacco and tobacco curing to present the sociology of sugar.

The status of sugar, as a product of refining, was compared to drugs:

Heroin is nothing but a chemical. They take the juice of the poppy and they refine it into opium and then they refine it to morphine and finally to heroin. Sugar is nothing but a chemical. They take the juice of the cane or the beet and then refine it to molasses and then they refine it to brown sugar and finally to strange white crystals. (page 22)

Later, the euphemism, "made from natural ingredients", is cited as equally applicable to heroin and sugar. (page 148)

== Contents ==
The book has 14 chapters, 78 references, five pages of notes, and a 10-page index. The book reviews the history of the world from the point of view of sugar, sounding the alarm of its deleterious and debilitating effects. The chapters are:

It Is Necessary to be Personal
Gloria Swanson alerted Dufty to sugar's threat to health.
The Mark of Cane
"Benjamin Delessert found a way to prepare the lowly Babylonian beet into a new kind of sugar loaf at Plessy in 1812. Napoleon awarded him the Legion of Honour. Napoleon ordered sugar beets planted everywhere in France, an imperial factory was established for refining, scholarships were granted to schools for sugar beet crafts; 500 licences were created for sugar refineries. By the very next year, Napoleon had achieved the herculean feat of producing eight million pounds of sugar from homegrown beets. When Napoleonic armies set out for Moscow, their sugar rations were insured. Like the Moors before them, they were turned back while traveling north. The mighty French army, in the unaccustomed climate, had met their match and more, including the armies of a backward people who had not yet accustomed themselves to sugar in their tea." (page 38)
How We Got Here from There
"Arab and Jewish physicians used sugar carefully in minuscule amounts, adding it to their prescriptions with great care. It was a brain boggler. It could cause the human body and brain to run the gamut in no time at all from exhaustion to hallucination." (page 46) Maurice Mességué led Dufty through his garden of healing herbs. (pages 56–9)
In Sugar We Trust
Linus Pauling and Thomas Szasz are cited on the threat to mental well-being.
Blame It on the Bees
Diabetes mellitus suffering increased as sugar usage grew. Nyoiti Sakurazawa found the cure in traditional Japanese eating, and in 1971 research confirmed that a diet high in carbohydrates, ironically, improved human capacity to moderate blood sugar level.
From the Nipple to the Needle
Describes diabetic hypoglycemia with a reference to the film Men in White (1934) and gives a narrative of "George's" insulin dependency.
Of Cabbages and Kings
Thomas Willis warned of scurvy from sugar and James Lind suggested a cure.
How to Complicate Simplicity
The Engelberg machine debilitates the potential nutrition from grains.
Dead Dogs and Englishmen
Why sugar calories are empty calories.
Codes of Honesty
Harvey Wiley made the mistake of mentioning saccharin to Theodore Roosevelt.
What the Specialists Say
Peptic ulcers were discussed on the David Susskind Show, but not John Yudkin's theory.
Reach for a Lucky Instead of a Sweet?
Usually sugar in the mouth and on the enamel of teeth is said to feed bacteria that can cause dental caries. Experimenters have shown that sugar acts inside the enamel as well, constricting flows in the dentin. This metabolic effect of sugar in the diet inhibits preservation of enamel by supply from tooth pulp, through dentin, to enamel.
Kicking
The sugar-laced diet is a form of substance abuse and must be dealt with as an addiction. Recommendations are given for both individuals and families. "In kicking sugar, the most helpful extra hint I can give you is the one that worked for me. Kick red meat at the same time...Meat (which is masculine yang) sets up a powerful yen in your system to be balanced with its opposite – something very sweet and feminine and yin, like fruit and sugar." (page 209)
Soup to Nuts
As an antidote to Fannie Farmer’s cookbooks, Dufty offered an introduction to the use of tamari, pressed salad, buckwheat, sprouting, free-range eggs, garlic, tahini, brown rice, dried fruit, umeboshi, compote, root vegetables, crepes, walnuts, and chestnuts.

== Mentions ==
Dufty's wife, Gloria Swanson, traveled the United States to promote the book in 1975.

A study of depression avoidance included Sugar Blues as one of its "books which treat either primarily or in particular chapters the role of nutritional and dietary factors in the promotion of mental well-being and prevention of disorder...on the role of diet in particular disorders...functional hypoglycemia (Duffy [sic] 1975)."

John Lennon’s personal assistant Frederic Seaman described Lennon’s diet in the book The Last Days of John Lennon (1991). When Seaman started in the job, Dufty’s book loomed large:

Punctuating his speech with slight hand gestures, he then launched into a passionate lecture on the dangers of sugar and told me to keep an eye out for a book entitled Sugar Blues at Better Nature, the local health food store where I would buy most of his food. He extolled the book by Gloria Swanson’s former [sic] husband William Duffy [sic], because it exposed sugar as a "poison". He asserted that he did not want Sean to become a "sugar junkie", like so many other American kids who grew up to be overweight, pimply teenagers.

A food science educator listed Sugar Blues as a sample text to stimulate critical thinking necessary to become a food scientist:

Processed foods, artificial ingredients, chemicals in our foods, and unnatural foods have long been the target of books, [six are listed, including "Sugar Blues", by William Dufty, 1975] but there seems to be limited understanding of food science...A critical reading of one or more of these sources or alternatives is recommended to see if there is what we can learn as we practice our profession and how to respond to criticism that we may receive.

A practitioner of integrative medicine, Tris Trethart MD, was interviewed by the medical journal Integrative Medicine and he explained:

Early in my premedical training, I read a book called Sugar Blues by William Dufty, and the information in that book actually changed my thought belief system and patterns of eating so drastically that it, essentially, changed my life...The drastic improvements in my health changed my attitudes towards the way I was living at the time...

Historians Heather Hendershot and Mark Pendergrast have criticized the book for comparing sugar to drugs and suggesting its role in a variety of illnesses including bubonic plague.

The extreme range of maladies Dufty assigns to sugar has been used to make the indictment appear absurd:

Sugar Blues stands out more than any other work before or since in terms of its far-reaching and farfetched attempts to vilify sugar: the author (William Dufty) depicted sugar quite literally as a scourge to humanity. Dufty implicated sucrose as being a contributor to a variety of what are often termed mental illnesses such as schizophrenia, addiction, and alcoholism. Dufty argued that what was perceived as witchcraft several hundred years ago may in fact have been due to a madness brought on by eating sugar. Additionally, a case was made by Dufty for sugar being a possible cause of the bubonic plague...tuberculosis, suicide, epilepsy, crime, divorce, baldness, impotency, varicose veins, and of course cancer...Further, in this same treatise some of the more common charges against sugar were described including of course hypoglycemia...hyperactivity, vitamin deficiencies...obesity, heart disease, tooth decay, ulcers, and diabetes mellitus.

== See also ==
- Robert H. Lustig
- Seale Harris
