= Reg Allen (set decorator) =

American set decorator

- Born: Reginald Louvain Allen; 12 April 1917; Wolverhampton, Staffordshire, England
- Died: 30 March 1989 (aged 71); Laguna Beach, California
- Occupation: Set decorator
- Years active: 1963-1980

Reg Allen (12 April 1917 – 30 March 1989) was an American set decorator. He was nominated for an Academy Award in the category Best Art Direction for the film Lady Sings the Blues.

== Selected filmography ==
- The Pink Panther (1963)
- The Party (1968)
- Lady Sings the Blues (1972)
