= Uncle Sam (cereal) =

Breakfast cereal made by Post

- Product type: Breakfast cereal
- Current owner: Post Consumer Brands
- Produced by: Three Sisters Cereal
- Country: United States
- Introduced: 1908; 118 years ago
- Discontinued: 2024
- Previous owners: U.S. Mills
- Website: threesisters.com/unclesam

Uncle Sam was an American brand of ready-to eat breakfast cereal that was first introduced in 1908 by U.S. Mills of Omaha, Nebraska. The company relocated to Needham, Massachusetts sometime after the 1970s. Attune Foods of San Francisco acquired Uncle Sam Cereal in 2009. In 2013 Post Foods acquired Attune Foods. Post Foods discontinued Uncle Sam cereal in December 2024.

Uncle Sam Original cereal, since 1908 consisted of toasted whole wheat berry kernels that were steamed, rolled and toasted into flakes. Whole flaxseed were then mixed with the flakes. This high-fiber, ready-to-eat cereal had a low glycemic index and had an exceptionally high amount of omega-3 per serving because of the flaxseed. It was marketed as a "natural laxative" because of the presence of flaxseed, though clinical support for this assertion was scant.

Because of its nutritional profile, Uncle Sam Cereal was recommended by several well-known dietitians and nutritionists, as well as in top-selling diet books such as Rip Esselstyn's The Engine 2 Diet, Belly Fat Cure, Sugar Busters and the South Beach Diet.

== History ==
In 1908, Lafayette Coltrin (1840-1917) established the Uncle Sam Breakfast Food Company at 4201-7 North 28th Avenue and Sahler Street in North Omaha, Nebraska. The warehouse was located in the Belt Line railway industrial complex.

Coltrin and Ambrose H. Lee patented the cereal in 1909.

In 1910, the United States Department of Agriculture Bureau of Chemistry (a precursor of the FDA) sued Uncle Sam for "misinforming customers about the cereal’s health values" in advertisements. The company was fined $10 and disallowed from medicinal claims. Following the suit, "Uncle Sam focused on simply relieving constipation instead of the array of health issues they wanted to address."

In 1912, more than 100 economic tourists of Omaha attended a factory tour and received "bowls of Uncle Sam" as well as gift bags of Omaha souvenirs. In May 1913, the plant was expanded to twice in size. A cement elevator was added in 1914, which continues to operate as of 2018.

During World War I (c. 1914 – c. 1918), Uncle Sam produced a barley cereal which "allowed more wheat to be used for troops overseas, and allowed for slowed wheat production on farms across the nation." In 1917, Coltrin died in Long Beach, California.

In 1926, the company manufactured Skinner’s Raisin Bran (the first raisin bran cereal), for the Skinner Macaroni Company of Omaha. Uncle Sam purchased the rights for Skinner's Raisin Bran in 1964, and by 1985 the Raisin Bran outsold the company’s flagship product.

In 1968, "the Uncle Sam plant was attacked by vandals in May 1968, with more than 50 windows smashed early on a Saturday morning."

== Cereal contents ==
A 3/4 cup (60 grams) serving contained: 220 calories, 40 from fat; total fat 5 g; trans fat 0 g; cholesterol 0 mg; sodium 135 mg; potassium 250 mg; total carbohydrates 38 g; dietary fiber 10 g; soluble fiber 2 g; insoluble fiber 8 g; sugars less than 1 g.

It contained the following daily values: vitamin C 2%; calcium 4%; iron 10%; thiamin 50%; riboflavin 50%; niacin 50%; phosphorus 20%; magnesium 25%.

Ingredients: whole wheat kernels, whole flaxseed, salt, barley malt, niacin, riboflavin (vitamin B_{2}), thiamin mononitrate (vitamin B_{1}).
