= Sanpaku =

Physical characteristic of the eye

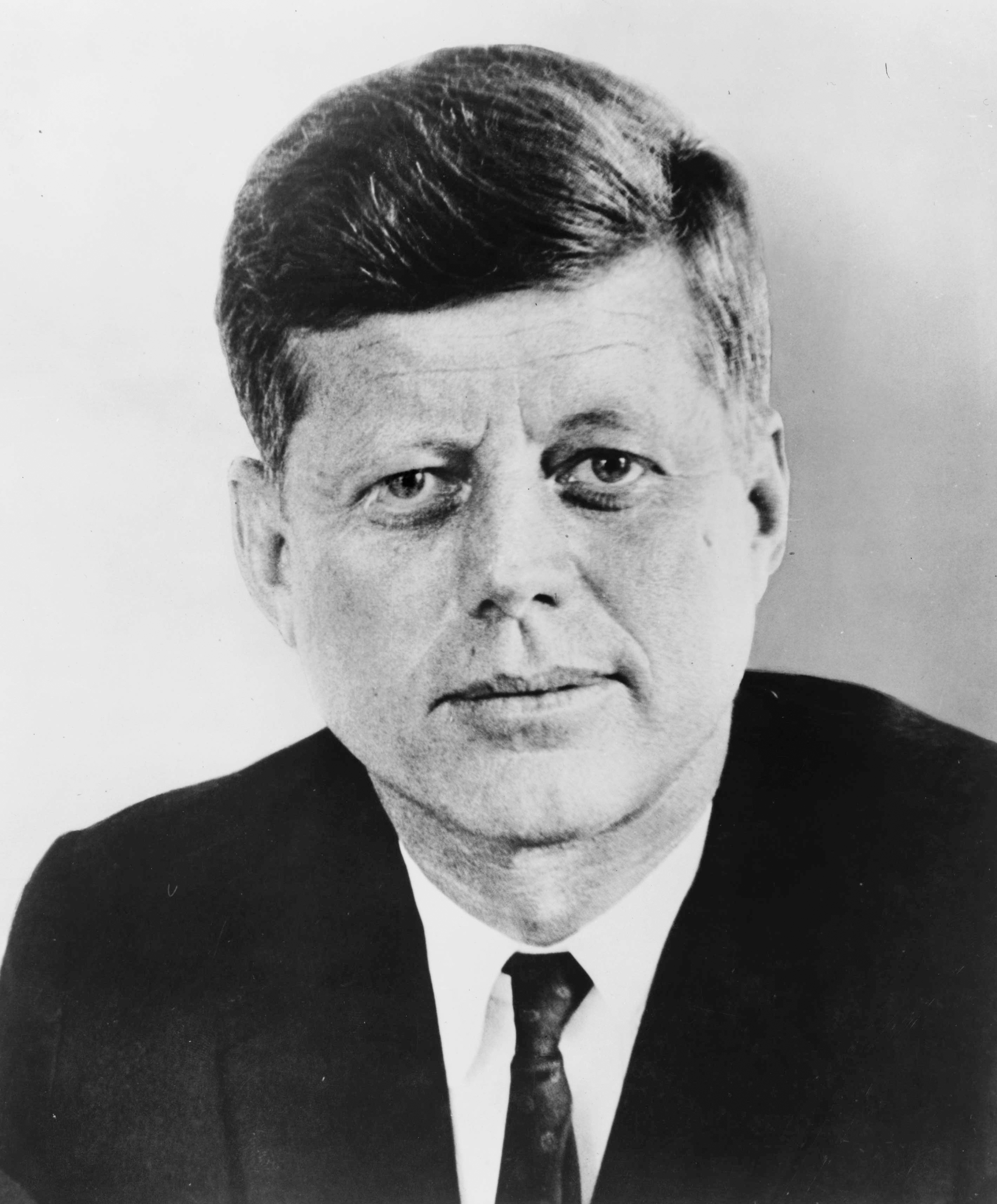
John F. Kennedy, one of the twelve famous people George Ohsawa claimed were suffering from sanpaku because of visible sclerae under their irises.

Sanpaku (三白; lit. 'three whites') or sanpaku gan (三白眼; Chinese: 三白眼; pinyin: Sānbáiyǎn; lit. 'three-white eyes') is a Japanese term referring to a person with visible sclera on three sides of their irises: the normal left and right, plus above or below. The term is most often used in English to refer to a folk belief whereby it functions as an omen or symptom in alternative medicine. It was introduced into English in the mid-1960s by George Ohsawa as a condition supposedly cured by his macrobiotic method.

In manga iconography, sanpaku eyes are used to make a character seem dangerous or threatening.

== History ==
According to traditional Chinese and Japanese face reading, the eye is composed of two parts, the yin (black, iris and pupil) and the yang (white, sclera). The visibility of the sclera beneath the iris is said to represent physical imbalance in the body, and is claimed to be present in alcoholics, drug addicts, and people who over-consume sugar or grain. Conversely, the visibility of the upper sclera is said to be an indication of mental imbalance in people such as psychotics, murderers, and anyone rageful. In either condition, it is believed that these people attract accidents and violence.

In August 1963, George Ohsawa, an advocate for macrobiotics, predicted that President John F. Kennedy would experience great danger because of his sanpaku condition.

In 1965, Ohsawa, assisted by William Dufty, wrote You Are All Sanpaku, which offers the following perspective on the condition:

For thousands of years, people of the Far East have been looking into each other's eyes for signs of this dreaded condition. Any sign of sanpaku meant that a man's entire system — physical, physiological and spiritual — was out of balance. He had committed sins against the order of the universe and he was therefore sick, unhappy, insane, what the West has come to call "accident prone". The condition of sanpaku is a warning, a sign from nature, that one's life is threatened by an early and tragic end.

According to Ohsawa, this condition could be treated by a macrobiotic diet emphasizing brown rice and soybeans.

== See also ==
- Kubrick stare
- Macrobiotic diet
- New Age
- Physiognomy
