= Lady Sings the Blues (book) =

1956 autobiography by Billie Holiday and William Dufty

- First edition
- Author: Billie Holiday; William Dufty
- Language: English
- Genre: Autobiography
- Publisher: Doubleday
- Publication date: 1956
- Publication place: United States
- Media type: Print

Lady Sings the Blues (1956) is an autobiography by jazz singer Billie Holiday, which was co-authored by William Dufty. The book formed the basis of the 1972 film Lady Sings the Blues starring Diana Ross.

== Overview ==
The life story of jazz singer Billie Holiday told in her own words. Holiday writes candidly of sexual abuse, confinement to institutions, heroin addiction, and the struggles of being African American before the rise of the Civil Rights Movement.

According to an article in the San Francisco Chronicle, Dufty's aim was "to let Holiday tell her story her way. Fact checking wasn't his concern." Since its publication, the book has been criticized for factual inaccuracies.

In his introduction to the 2006 edition of Lady Sings the Blues, music biographer David Ritz writes: "(Holiday's) voice, no matter how the Dufty/Holiday interviewing process went, is as real as rain." Despite some factual inaccuracies, according to Ritz, "in the mythopoetic sense, Holiday's memoir is as true and poignant as any tune she ever sang. If her music was autobiographically true, her autobiography is musically true."

In his 2015 study of Holiday, Billie Holiday: The Musician and the Myth, John Szwed argues that Lady Sings the Blues, is a generally accurate account of Holiday's life, and that Holiday's co-writer, William Dufty, was forced to water down or suppress material by the threat of legal action. The New Yorker reviewer Richard Brody writes: "In particular, Szwed traces the stories of two important relationships that are missing from the book—with Charles Laughton, in the nineteen-thirties, and with Tallulah Bankhead, in the late nineteen-forties—and of one relationship that’s sharply diminished in the book, her affair with Orson Welles around the time of Citizen Kane."
