= Lady Sings the Blues (film) =

1972 film by Sidney J. Furie

- Theatrical release poster by Bill Gold
- Directed by: Sidney J. Furie
- Screenplay by: Terence McCloy; Chris Clark; Suzanne de Passe
- Based on: Lady Sings the Blues by Billie Holiday; William Dufty
- Produced by: Jay Weston; James S. White
- Starring: Diana Ross; Billy Dee Williams; Richard Pryor
- Cinematography: John A. Alonzo
- Edited by: Argyle Nelson
- Music by: Michel Legrand
- Production company: Motown Productions
- Distributed by: Paramount Pictures
- Release date: October 12, 1972
- Running time: 144 minutes
- Country: United States
- Language: English
- Budget: over $2 million
- Box office: $19.7 million

Lady Sings the Blues is a 1972 American biographical musical drama film directed by Sidney J. Furie about jazz singer Billie Holiday, loosely based on her 1956 autobiography that, in turn, took its title from Holiday's song. It is produced by Motown Productions for Paramount Pictures. Diana Ross, in her feature film debut, portrays Holiday, alongside a cast that includes Billy Dee Williams, Richard Pryor, James T. Callahan and Scatman Crothers. The film was nominated for five Academy Awards in 1973, including Best Actress for Diana Ross.

== Plot ==
In 1928 Baltimore, Eleanora Fagan, also known as Billie Holiday, works as a 15-year-old housekeeper in a brothel. A man who follows her from the brothel eventually rapes her. She flees to her mother Sadie, who sets her up with a job cleaning for another brothel in Harlem. The brothel is run by Lorraine, a woman who pays little money to Billie. Billie tires of scrubbing floors and becomes a prostitute but soon quits and returns to a nightclub to unsuccessfully audition to become a showgirl. After "Piano Man" accompanies Billie when she sings a song, (Note: More specifically "All of Me".) club owner Jerry books her as a singer in the show.

Billie's debut begins unsuccessfully until Louis McKay arrives and gives her a twenty-dollar tip. (Note: Equivalent to $375 in 2025.) Billie soon begins a relationship with Louis. Eventually, she is discovered by bandleaders Harry and Reg Hanley, who sign her as a soloist for their southern tour in hopes of landing a radio network gig. During the tour, Billie witnesses the aftermath of the lynching of an African-American man, which presses her to record a song. (Note: "Strange Fruit".) The harsh experiences on the tour result in Billie taking drugs, which Harry supplies after she collapses on stage. One night, when Billie is performing, Louis comes to see her. After realizing that Billie is doing drugs, Louis says that she is going home with him. Billie promises to stay off the drugs if Louis stays with her.

In New York, Reg and Louis arrange for Billie's radio debut, but the station does not call her up to the stage to sing; the radio sponsor, a soap company, objected to her race. Disappointed, the group heads to Cafe Manhattan. There, Billie gets drunk and asks Harry for drugs. He, however, refuses. Angered, Billie is ready to leave, but Louis arranged for her to sing at the Cafe, a club where she once aspired to sing. She obliges with one song but refuses an encore, leaving him in need of a fix. Louis, suspicious that Billie broke her promise, takes her back to his home but refuses to allow her access to the bathroom or her kit. She fights Louis for it, pulling a razor on him. Louis leaves her to shoot up, saying that he does not want her there when he returns.

Billie returns to the Harlem nightclub, where her drug use intensifies until she hears of Sadie's death. Billie checks herself into a drug clinic, but cannot afford her treatment there. The doctor secretly calls Louis, who starts paying her bills without her knowledge. Impressed with the initiative that she has taken to straighten herself out, Louis proposes to her at the hospital.

Billie is soon arrested for possession of narcotics and removed from the clinic. In prison, she goes through withdrawal. Louis brings the doctor from the hospital to treat her, but she is incoherent. He puts a ring on her finger to remind Billie of his promise to marry her. After finishing her sentence, Billie returns home and does not want to sing anymore.

Billie marries Louis and pledges not to continue her career. She, however, eventually returns to singing, with Louis as her manager. However, her felony conviction stripped Billie of her Cabaret Card, which would allow her to sing in New York nightclubs. To restore public confidence and regain her license, Billie agrees to a cross-country tour. Her career takes off on the nightclub circuit.

Louis leaves for New York to arrange for a comeback performance for Billie at Carnegie Hall. Despondent at Louis's absence and the constant stream of venues, Billie asks Piano Man to pawn the ring that Louis gave her in exchange for drugs. While they are high that evening, Piano Man's drug connections arrive; he neither pawned the ring nor paid for the drugs. The dealers kill Piano Man. Within the hour, Louis and her promoter call Billie with news that they completed the Carnegie Hall deal. Louis returns to find a traumatized Billie, who has fallen back into drugs.

Billie plays at Carnegie Hall but never succeeds in swaying the commission to restore her license. Billie is eventually re-arrested on drug charges and dies at age 44.

== Cast ==
- Diana Ross as Billie Holiday
- Billy Dee Williams as Louis McKay. Levi Stubbs, the baritone vocalist for The Four Tops, was originally considered for the role before Williams was cast.
- Richard Pryor as Piano Man
- James Callahan as Reg Hanley
- Paul Hampton as Harry Hanley
- Sid Melton as Jerry, the club owner
- Virginia Capers as Sadie Fagan Holiday, Billie's mother
- Yvonne Fair as Yvonne
- Isabel Sanford as Madame
- Jester Hairston as Fefe
- Lynn Hamilton as Aunt Ida
- Victor Morosco as Vic
- Robert Gordy as The Hawk
- Harry Caesar as The Rapist
- Paulene Myers as Mrs. Edson
- Scatman Crothers as Big Ben
- Milton Selzer as The Doctor
- Ned Glass as The Agent

== Release ==
=== Home media ===
The film was released on VHS and LaserDisc in 1980, and on DVD on November 8, 2005. The film debuted on Blu-ray on February 23, 2021.

== Reception ==
=== Box office ===
The film earned an estimated $9,050,000 in North American rentals in 1973. Its overall domestic box office totaled $19,726,490.

=== Critical reception ===
Reception for the film was mixed, with most critics praising Ross's performance.

Pauline Kael for The New Yorker wrote that the film "failed to do justice to the musical life of which Billie Holiday was a part."

Vincent Canby of The New York Times described Ross as "an actress of exceptional beauty and wit, who is very much involved in trying to make a bad movie work ... her only apparent limitations are those imposed on her by a screenplay and direction seemingly designed to turn a legitimate legend into a whopper of a cliché."

Variety wrote, "For the bulk of general audiences, the film serves as a very good screen debut vehicle for Diana Ross, supported strongly by excellent casting, handsome '30s physical values, and a script which is far better in dialog than structure."

Roger Ebert of the Chicago Sun-Times gave the film three stars out of four, writing that Ross had given "one of the great performances of 1972", and observing that the film "has most of the clichés we expect—but do we really mind clichés in a movie like this? I don't think so."

Gene Siskel of the Chicago Tribune also awarded three stars out of four, writing, "The fact that 'Lady Sings the Blues' is a failure as a biography of legendary jazz singer Billie Holiday doesn't mean it can't be an entertaining movie. And it is just that—entertaining—because of an old fashioned grand dame performance by Diana Ross, late of the pop-rock scene, in the title role."

Charles Champlin of the Los Angeles Times wrote that Ross gave "one of the truly fine screen performances, full of power and pathos and enormously engaging and sympathetic".

Pauline Kael of The New Yorker wrote that "when the movie was over I wrote 'I love it' on my pad of paper ... Factually it's a fraud, but emotionally it delivers. It has what makes movies work for a mass audience: easy pleasure, tawdry electricity, personality—great quantities of personality."

Tom Milne of The Monthly Film Bulletin wrote that Ross did "a remarkable pastiche job on the tone and timbre of Billie Holiday's voice, [but] misses the elegant, almost literary wit of her phrasing" and found the presentation of Holiday's life story "offensively simplistic".

On the review aggregator website Rotten Tomatoes, 73% of 62 critics' reviews are positive.

=== Accolades ===
Award	Category	Nominee(s)	Result	Ref.
Academy Awards	Best Actress	Diana Ross	Nominated	
Academy Awards	Best Original Screenplay	Chris Clark, Suzanne de Passe, and Terence McCloy	Nominated	
Academy Awards	Best Art Direction	Art Direction: Carl Anderson; Set Decoration: Reg Allen	Nominated	
Academy Awards	Best Costume Design	Ray Aghayan, Norma Koch, and Bob Mackie	Nominated	
Academy Awards	Best Scoring: Adaptation and Original Song Score	Gil Askey	Nominated	
British Academy Film Awards	Best Actress in a Leading Role	Diana Ross	Nominated	
Golden Globe Awards	Best Actress in a Motion Picture – Drama	Diana Ross	Nominated	
Golden Globe Awards	Most Promising Newcomer – Female	Diana Ross	Won	
Golden Globe Awards	Best Original Score – Motion Picture	Michel Legrand	Nominated	
NAACP Image Awards	Outstanding Motion Picture		Won	
NAACP Image Awards	Outstanding Actor in a Motion Picture	Billy Dee Williams	Won	
NAACP Image Awards	Outstanding Actress in a Motion Picture	Diana Ross	Won	

The film was also screened at the 1973 Cannes Film Festival, but was not entered into the main competition.

The film is recognized by American Film Institute in these lists:

- 2004: AFI's 100 Years...100 Songs:
  - "God Bless the Child" – Nominated

== Soundtrack ==
Motown released a successful soundtrack double album of Ross's recordings of Billie Holiday songs from the film, also titled Lady Sings the Blues. The album went to number one on the Billboard Top LPs & Tape chart in 1973.

== See also ==
- Lady Day at Emerson's Bar and Grill – A 1986 play and 2016 television movie, starring Audra McDonald.
- The United States vs. Billie Holiday – A 2021 biopic of Billie Holiday, starring Andra Day.
- List of American films of 1972
