= Sagen Ishizuka =

Japanese doctor (1851–1909)

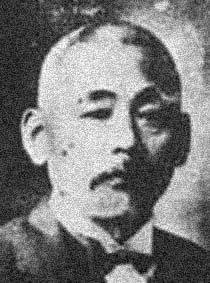
- Born: March 6, 1850; Japan
- Died: October 17, 1909 (aged 59); Japan
- Other names: 石塚左玄
- Occupation: Physician
- Known for: Food education, macrobiotic diet

Sagen Ishizuka (石塚 左玄, Ishizuka Sagen; March 6, 1850 – October 17, 1909) was a doctor in the Imperial Japanese Army who pioneered the concepts of shokuiku (food education) and the macrobiotic diet. He was one of the first to investigate the nutritional value of whole grains as well as sea vegetables, daikon, and kudzu.

== Biography ==
He was born into a modest family of traditional physicians, and continued their tradition by going into medicine. Having little wealth, he ended up teaching himself basic techniques while working as a language teacher. By the age of 16 he had already learned the Dutch language, essential to study Western medicine in Japan. (He later also successfully mastered German, French and English.) During the next seven years he taught himself anatomy, botany, chemistry, physics and astronomy.

At the age of 24, he enlisted in the army as Imperial Japanese trainee physician. At 31, he received the degree of military pharmacist and later of "military physician". He remained in the army for 22 years, retiring with the high degree of "chief military pharmacist". This experience was very useful, since he was confronted in practice with all sorts of diseases and injuries. (He participated in the Satsuma Rebellion in 1877 and First Sino-Japanese War of 1894.)

During his professional career, he was disappointed by the western medical system and became gradually convinced that traditional medicine (which often relied on prescribing a simple change of diet) was more effective. He suffered from eczema from childhood and chronic nephritis that conventional medicine could not heal. He developed a theory that the secret to health and healing was to strengthen the body from within by a balanced dietary regime. The scheme was, however, almost the equivalent of the traditional Japanese diet.

When he returned to civilian society, he opened a free clinic and began to practice exclusively using his own method. With the support of leading figures (members of the Japanese imperial family, consuls, and other relationships acquired thanks to his high military rank) he quickly became successful. The demands increased so much that consultations had to be limited to 100 per day; his popularity became such that he got mail with incomplete addresses such as "For the Anti-Doctor Doctor, Tokyo", "Doctor Vegetables, Tokyo" or "Doctor Daikon, Tokyo" (as he often prescribed daikon).

In 1907 he created the association "Shokuyō" (食養 "Food for Health") to spread and perpetuate his method.

== Ishizuka's theory of health and nutrition ==
Ishizuka’s theory is based on the following principles:

- Human health and longevity depend on the balance between sodium and potassium. Where Western theories of nutrition insisted on the importance of proteins and carbohydrates, Ishizuka considered minerals, especially sodium and potassium, critical to health as their interrelationship determines the ability of the body to absorb and use other nutrients, the proper functioning of the whole body depending on their balance.
- Food is the major factor determining this balance. Other factors such as geography or climate, physical activity or psychological stress play a secondary role. Living in the mountains or the sea, a dry or wet place, being sedentary or having a strong physical activity produces a certain effect, but what is inserted into the digestive system is basically what determines the relationship between sodium and potassium in the body.
- Health and sickness depend on food before anything else. The physical base of operation is achieved through proper daily intake of food, balanced at the level of mineral salts. Disease occurs because of an imbalance between sodium and potassium caused by eating improperly. According to Ishizuka, both acute and chronic diseases (infectious or viral) are due to bad food: germs or viruses cannot attack an organism in which the relationship between sodium and potassium are well balanced, even in a case of physical contact.

Ishizuka collected his studies in a work called "A Chemical Theory of Nutrition on Health and Longevity", which was published in 1897 in Japan but has never been translated into any Western language.

== See also ==
- George Ohsawa
