= Shokuiku =

Food education in Japan

Shokuiku (Kanji: 食育) is the Japanese term for "food education". The law defines it as the "acquisition of knowledge about food and nutrition, as well as the ability to make appropriate decisions through practical experience with food, with the aim of developing people's ability to live on a healthy diet".

== History ==
Shokuiku as a subject was initiated by Sagen Ishizuka, a famous military doctor and pioneer of the macrobiotic diet. Following the introduction of Western fast food in the late 20th century, the Japanese government mandated education in nutrition and food origins, starting with the Basic Law of Shokuiku in 2005, and followed with the School Health Law in 2008. Universities have established programs to teach shokuiku in public schools, as well as investigating its effectiveness through academic study.

Major concerns that led to the development of shokuiku law include schoolchildren skipping breakfast, children purchasing meals at a convenience store instead of eating with their parents, and families not eating meals together.

Classes in shokuiku study the processes of making food like farming and fermentation, how additives create flavor, and where food comes from.
