= PopUp Bagels =

American bagel franchise

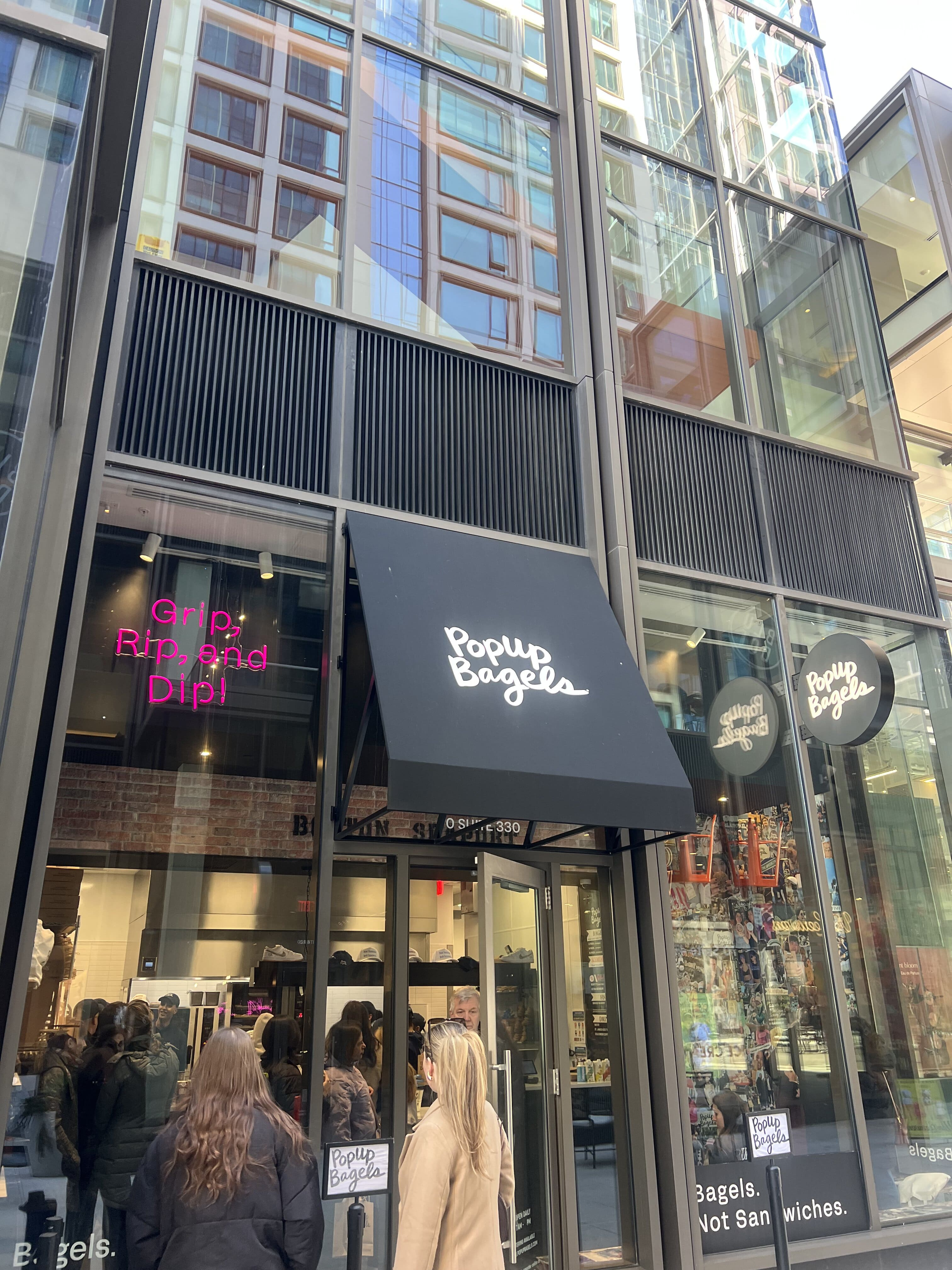
- PopUp Bagels entryway in Boston, Massachusetts
- Founded: 2020 in Westport, Connecticut
- Founder: Adam Goldberg; Jeff Lewis
- Number of locations: 50 stores (2026)
- Owner: Stripes (growth equity firm); Tiger Global Management
- Website: popupbagels.com

PopUp Bagels is an American boutique bagel franchise started by Adam Goldberg and Jeff Lewis in Westport, Connecticut in 2020. Originally a pop-up for Connecticut locals, it has now established retail and franchise locations along the East Coast, as well as in the states of California, Nevada, Tennessee, Texas and Illinois.

== History ==
Adam Goldberg and Jeff Lewis started baking as a pandemic hobby, switching from sourdough to bagels due to the heat of the summer. Goldberg gave away the bagels to his friends and family but after a few months of steady increased demand for the bagels, he decided to make it a business where customers pre-order their bagels and cream cheese in orders of three, six, or twelve.

Goldberg started with a subscription service, mainly serving bagels by the dozen for $38. The service offered familiar and novel rotational cream cheese flavors—or schmears—such as pesto butter or cacio e pepe. Early on, they worked with local businesses to make new flavors. According to Goldberg, ideas for flavors have also come from employees, customers, and partnerships with major brands.

The company received a lot of attention on social media leading to funding from private investors, including some celebrities. In 2023, private equity company Stripes acquired a majority stake. In April 2026, Tiger Global Management invested an undisclosed amount at a valuation of $300 million, with plans to open 300 stores.
