= Stripes (growth equity firm) =

American growth equity firm

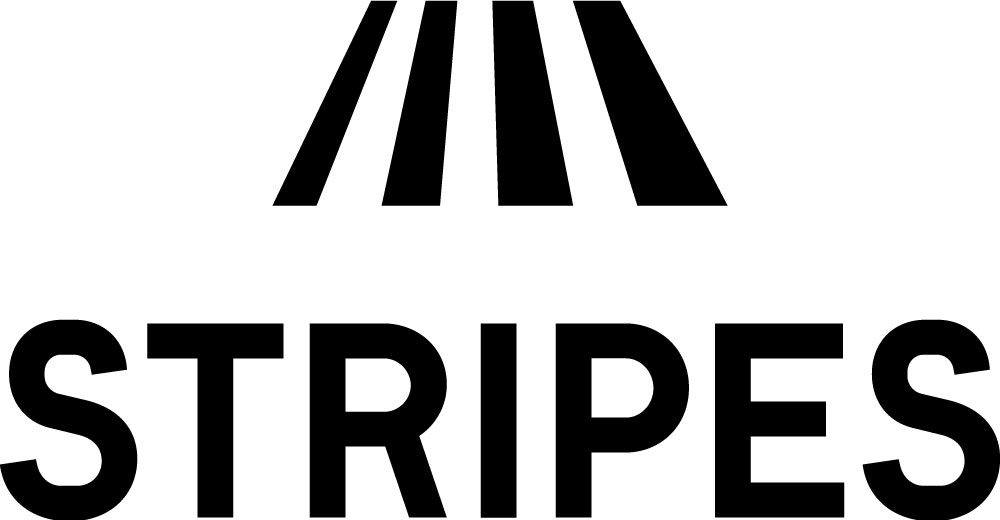
- Type: Privately held company
- Industry: Private equity; Growth equity
- Founded: 2008
- Founder: Ken Fox
- Headquarters: 40 10th Avenue, 5th Floor, New York, New York, US
- Total assets: US$7 billion (self-reported)
- Website: www.stripes.co

Stripes (Stripes, LLC; formerly Stripes Group) is an American private equity and growth equity firm based in Manhattan, New York City, founded in 2008 by Ken Fox. The firm invests in technology and branded consumer companies, typically taking minority growth-stage stakes. As of 2025, it reported more than US$7 billion in assets under management.

== History ==
Stripes was founded in 2008 by Ken Fox, who had previously co-founded the technology holding company Internet Capital Group in 1995. The firm was originally named Stripes Group and later shortened its name to Stripes. It concentrates on technology and branded consumer products.

== Investments ==
Stripes has invested in technology, consumer products and retail companies. In technology, it led a US$50 million round in the work-management platform Monday.com in 2018, an investment that preceded the company's 2021 public listing. The firm has also backed the card-issuing startup Lithic, whose 2021 financing valued the company at US$800 million. Its consumer and retail investments include the running-shoe company On, which went public in 2021, the grocer Erewhon, the fashion label Khaite, and the food brand Siete, which was later acquired by PepsiCo. The firm has additionally invested in a 2022 financing of the film studio A24.
