= Attune Foods =

American food company

- Company type: Subsidiary
- Founded: 1908; 118 years ago
- Brands: Uncle Sam Cereal; Erehwon; New Morning; Skinner's
- Parent: Post Holdings

Attune Foods is a manufacturer of natural and organic cereals and probiotic snack bars that was purchased by Post Foods in 2013. The company was founded in 1908, with the introduction of Uncle Sam Cereal, which it still sells. Its other brands are Erewhon, New Morning, and Skinner's.

The chocolate version of the Attune snack bar
