= VerticalNet =

Verticalnet, Inc.
- Founded: 1995; 31 years ago
- Founder: Michael McNulty; Michael Hagan
- Fate: Acquired by Bravo Solutions (2008)
- Headquarters: Horsham, Pennsylvania
- Revenue: ▼$16 million (2006)
- Net income: ▼ -$24 million (2006)
- Total assets: ▼$20 million (2006)
- Total equity: ▼$2 million (2006)
- Number of employees: 88 (2006)

Verticalnet, Inc. was a host of 43 business-to-business (B2B) procurement portals headquartered in Horsham, Pennsylvania. At the peak of the dot-com bubble in 2000, the company was worth $10.89 billion; it was acquired by Bravo Solutions in 2008 for $15.2 million, a 99.9% decline in value.

== History ==
Verticalnet was founded in 1995 by Michael McNulty and Michael Hagan with a site called WaterOnline.

In 1997, Mark Walsh joined the company as its chief executive officer.

In 1999, on the first day of trading after its initial public offering, its shares increased in value by 180%, valuing the company at $1.6 billion; quarterly revenue was $3.6 million. The company had 1,300 advertisers, each of which were paying $6,000 per year. At that time, Internet Capital Group, now Actua Corporation, owned 28% of the company and founders Michael McNulty and Michael Hagan were each worth $60 million on paper.

In 1999, the company lost $53.5 million on revenues of $18.4 million.

In January 2000, the company received a $100 million investment from Microsoft.

In March 2000, the company acquired Tradeum for 2 million shares of Verticalnet, worth $507 million at the time.

During 2000, the dot-com bubble burst, and the market capitalization of the company fell from a peak of $10.89 billion on March 10, 2000 to $3.89 billion on May 4, 2000.

In 2000, revenues increased to $112.5 million and the company posted a loss of $28.5 million.

In December 2000, Verticalnet sold NECX, an exchange for electronic components and computer systems, to Converge for $60 million in cash and a 19.9% stake in Converge.

In April 2001, Verticalnet restructured its agreement with Microsoft.

In 2002, Verticalnet acquired Atlas Commerce for 14.3 million shares of Verticalnet common stock and $3.5 million of cash and the company relocated to Malvern, Pennsylvania.

In 2002, VerticalNet sold its Small and Medium Business Group to Corry Publishing, now Jameson Publishing, for an up-front payment of $2.35 million and a four-year performance-based earn-out of $6.5 million, as well as the assumption of certain liabilities.

In 2008, Bravo Solutions acquired Verticalnet for $15.2 million.
