= Mark Walsh (businessman) =

American businessman (born 1954)

Mark Walsh (born in 1954) is an American entrepreneur, venture capitalist, and political activist.

== Career ==
Walsh graduated from Union College in 1976. Walsh started his career as a television newscaster at a West Virginia CBS affiliate. He was, at the time, the youngest TV Anchorman in America. He held this position for two years before leaving to pursue an MBA at the Harvard Business School, which he received in 1980. After graduating from Harvard, Walsh worked for four years as a director of New Business Development at HBO.

Walsh entered the internet and online communications industry, nascent as it was, in 1986, joining Comp-U-Card (which later become CUC International) as VP and GM of their online ecommerce, etravel, eauto and ehospitality division. He remained there until 1992, when he became president of KineXus, a venture capital backed interactive job and recruitment business.

In 1994, Walsh became president of GEnie, General Electric's online service. Walsh moved to AOL in early 1995 to become Sr. VP and head of all internet services. While at AOL, Walsh oversaw AOL Enterprise, its business-to-business division. In 1997, Walsh joined VerticalNet, a business-to-business portal provider, as its CEO. VerticalNet was backed by Internet Capital Group. Under Walsh's leadership, VerticalNet went public on the NASDAQ in 1999. Its market capitalisation reached $12.5 billion at the peak. Walsh is the managing partner of Ruxton Ventures, LLC, a private equity and investment firm he founded in early 2001. In 2005, Walsh became a senior executive fellow at the University of Maryland's Dingman Center for Entrepreneurship. In 2010, he was named chairman of the Dingman Center Board. From 2008 to 2012, Walsh was the CEO, co-founder, and chairman of GeniusRocket, a provider of crowdsourced advertising media. From late 2015 to early 2017, Walsh was head of the Office of Investment and Innovation at the U.S. Small Business Administration under President Barack Obama.

Walsh has served or serves on a number of not for profit and for profit boards: Union College (chair from 2011–15), The Philadelphia Orchestra, The Baltimore Symphony, The Street.com, GoCanvas.com, Tribeca Flashpoint College, and others.

== Political activism ==
Walsh has been active in bipartisan policy and liberal politics. He was named to the Board of Directors of the Bipartisan Policy Center in Washington, D.C., a pioneering think-tank founded by four former heads of the US Senate, Tom Daschle, George Mitchell, Howard Baker and Bob Dole. Walsh served as Chair of the Board for 2015, before joining the U.S Government. He served as the founding Board Chair the New Leaders Council, a major leadership training institution for young progressive talent. He held that post from 2006-2012. In 2004, Walsh served as CEO of Progress Media, parent organization of Air America Radio. Walsh also served as the Chief Technology Advisor to the Democratic National Committee during 2001 and 2002, and as the Head of Internet Strategy for John Kerry for President. In 2006, Walsh took began serving as co-host of XM Satellite Radio's Left Jab Radio, a weekly political radio show. The show ceased in 2015.
