= William Dufty =

American writer, musician, and activist (1916–2002)

- Born: William Francis Dufty; February 2, 1916 near Grand Rapids, Michigan, U.S.
- Died: June 28, 2002 (aged 86); Birmingham, Michigan, U.S.
- Occupations: Writer, musician
- Spouses: Maely Bartholomew; Gloria Swanson
- Children: Bevan Dufty

William Francis Dufty (February 2, 1916 – June 28, 2002) was an American writer, musician, and activist.

Dufty was a supporter of trade unionism and was an organizer for the United Auto Workers, wrote speeches for former UAW President Walter Reuther, edited Michigan Congress of Industrial Organizations (CIO) News and handled publicity for Americans for Democratic Action.

== Biography ==
Dufty was born near Grand Rapids, Michigan.

=== Youth ===
Dufty produced some autobiographical notes in the first chapter, "It is necessary to be personal", of his book Sugar Blues (1975):

We spent our summers at Crystal Lake until I was twelve or thirteen. By that time I was making $75 a week in the wintertime season – an undreamed of fortune in those days – as a prodigal jazz pianist on the radio...The day my voice began to change was the beginning of the end of my radio career. If my voice didn't sound childlike any more, there was nothing remarkable about the way I played the piano.

=== College ===
In the twenties, I had been so rich I never carried a cent on me. In the thirties – mooching my way through college holding a job or two on the side – I was so poor I put every cent on my back where it would show…I took to collegiate journalism as a kind of lark. There I discovered that the cigarette companies virtually subsidized the university paper with their advertising.

After suffering through two years of college, I finally dropped out. It took daring in those days to dream of facing life without a degree. But I could sniff another war in the offing...I was drafted in 1942...

=== Army ===
In due course my body was shipped overseas. Bound for Britain, I trotted around the top deck of the blacked out S.S. Mauretania with a carbine on by shoulder and a heavy Army greatcoat soaked with Atlantic spray. Two hours on, two hours off. By the time we docked in Liverpool, I had a lovely case of walking pneumonia.
Eventually, I was packed off by train to Glasgow, by ship to Algiers, then by truck to Oran in the Mediterranean. Three weeks in the desert and I was as good as new...After the landings in southern France, I was packed off to join the First French Army: Arabs, Senegalese, Goums, Sihks, Vietnamese, with French officers and noncoms. We lived off the land, no fancy rations and luxuries. Some brought along pots and pans, ducks and geese, sheep and goats, wives and mistresses...We lived on horsemeat, rabbit, squirrel, dark French peasant bread, and whatever else could be scrounged. Winter in the Vosges mountains was brutal and endless, yet I never had a cold or a sniffle.

=== New York ===
After the war, he moved to New York and began a newspaper career. His columns and exposés for the New York Post drew acclaim, including one that charged that the FBI bungled cases under J. Edgar Hoover's leadership. He was awarded the George Polk Award for an exposé on immigrants.

Dufty had one son, Bevan Dufty, with first wife Maely Bartholomew, who had arrived in New York City during World War II after losing most of her family in the Nazi concentration camps. She settled near Harlem where she met her best friend and Bevan's godmother, Billie Holiday. They later divorced and Maely raised Bevan as a single mother.

Dufty took Billie Holiday's oral history and wrote Lady Sings the Blues in 1956, which in turn was made into a 1972 movie starring Diana Ross in the title role.

=== Macrobiotic diet ===
Dufty credits the death of John F. Kennedy and an article by Tom Wolfe in New York Magazine with starting him on the way to good health. The article described a condition, sanpaku, as a morbid symptom that precedes death, according to Nyoiti Sakurazawa. After obtaining some literature from the Ohsawa Foundation in New York, and following its strict regime of vegetables and rice, Dufty transformed his body and mind. He lost weight and became "calm, cool, collected, precise, and unrattled". He became an advocate of macrobiotics, met Sakurazawa, and prepared the manuscript of You Are All Sanpaku for publication with Felix Morrow in 1965.

Dufty practiced and promoted macrobiotic nutrition, advocating a low-fat, high-fiber diet of whole grains, vegetables, sea vegetables, nuts and seeds, combined in accordance with the principles of yin and yang, said to optimize digestion by attention to nature.

Dufty had struggled with the symptoms of hypoglycemia and had sought the help of physicians. Describing the frustrating search similarly pursued by Dr. Steven Gyland, Dufty wrote,

If you've ever gone through this kind of medical rigmarole, as I and millions of others have, one ends up a little bitter, with a sense of mission.

In the 1960s, he met Gloria Swanson, a nutrition enthusiast who convinced him that white sugar was unsafe. Dufty undertook a program of research of the impact that sugar has had, and wrote Sugar Blues in 1975.

He became good friends with Japanese artist Yoko Ono and her husband, musician and former Beatle, John Lennon. When John and Yoko visited Singapore, they wrote to Swanson and Dufty. As Hunter Davies, editor of The John Lennon Letters explains,

[Swanson] was strongly against sugar, as a curse of society; her husband had written a book called Sugar Blues, which John Lennon bought lots of copies of, giving them out to friends.

=== Marriage and death ===
Dufty and Swanson were married, she for the sixth time, he for the second time, in 1976. He helped Swanson write her autobiography, Swanson on Swanson, in 1981.

After Swanson's death in 1983, he returned to his home state of Michigan, settling in Metro Detroit. From there he continued to lecture, write newspaper and magazine articles and teach macrobiotics to a new generation. Dufty died at age 86 on June 28, 2002, at his home in Birmingham, Michigan.

== Books ==
- 1956: Lady Sings the Blues, Billie Holiday with William Dufty
- 1958: My Father- My Son, by Edward G. Robinson Jr. with William Dufty, via HathiTrust
- 1965: You Are All Sanpaku, Sakurazawa Nyoiti with William Dufty
- 1966: Spoiled Priest: the Autobiography of an Ex-Priest, Gabriel Longo, University Books
- 1969: Mannequin My Life as a Model, Carolyn Kenmore, Bartholomew House Press
- 1975: Sugar Blues
- 1980: Swanson on Swanson, Gloria Swanson, Random House
