= Pete Musser =

American businessman (1926–2019)

- Born: Warren Van Dyke Musser; December 15, 1926; Harrisburg, Pennsylvania, U.S.
- Died: November 25, 2019 (aged 92); Bryn Mawr, Pennsylvania, U.S.
- Education: Lehigh University
- Occupation: Chairman of the Musser Group
- Known for: Billionaire on paper during the dot-com bubble

Warren Van Dyke "Pete" Musser (December 15, 1926 – November 25, 2019) was the chairman of the Musser Group. He was the founder of Safeguard Scientifics, a venture capital firm that invested in technology companies. At the peak of the dot-com bubble, Musser was a billionaire on paper; however, when the bubble burst, he lost almost his entire fortune.

Musser was a philanthropist and The Musser Foundation has donated over $50 million to organizations including the Boy Scouts of America.

Musser served on the board of directors of the Cradle of Liberty Council. The Musser Award for Excellence in Leadership from Fox School of Business and Management at Temple University and the Musser Scout Reservation in Montgomery County, Pennsylvania, are named after Musser.

== Early life and education ==
Musser was born in the Harrisburg, Pennsylvania, area on December 15, 1926. He earned a Bachelor of Science in Industrial Engineering at Lehigh University in 1949.

== Career ==
In 1952, at the age of 25, Musser began work as a stockbroker trainee for Hornblower & Weeks. The next year, he left the company with others to form their own company. In 1955, his company acquired Safe-Guard Corporation and in 1966, Musser's firm changed its name to Safeguard Industries. Musser invested in technology companies in Philicon Valley such as QVC, Comcast, and Novell, which resulted in a $200 million profit.

Musser was an early investor in Internet Capital Group (later Actua Corporation).

During the dot-com bubble, Musser was a billionaire on paper.

Musser was a director of TyCom, a subsidiary of Tyco International, and in December 2000, he borrowed $14.1 million from Tyco executives Dennis Kozlowski and Mark H. Swartz

On November 29, 2000, after the burst of the dot-com bubble, to repay a loan, Musser was forced to sell 6.5 million of his shares in Safeguard Scientifics for $8.25 per share, or $53.7 million. The stock price was down over 90% from the peak of $99 per share 9 months earlier. This left him with 560,000 shares in the company. In 2003, Musser defaulted on a $26.5 million loan from Safeguard Scientifics.

Musser was a member of the board of directors of Brandywine Realty Trust from 1996, when the company acquired properties from a joint venture of Safeguard Scientifics, until 2002.

== Personal life ==
Musser was married to Betty K. Musser (née Umstad) for 43 years. In November 2000, he married Hilary Grinker Musser, who was 39 years younger than he. They had a son in 2003 but separated in April 2005 and went through a messy divorce. In 2023, Hilary sued Safeguard Scientifics, claiming that the company colluded with Musser to force her into surrendering her assets to repay his debts.

Musser's son, Craig, a renowned kaleidoscope artist under the name Van Dyke, was partnered with Bruce Darda, a New York-based tech executive, at the time of his death from AIDS in 1986.

Musser spent lavishly on his residences, building his-and-hers tennis courts on his Nantucket residence and spending $100,000 on special garage doors. He borrowed $14 million for his vacation house.

Musser also was a contributor to Republican causes. He died on November 25, 2019.
