= Yokota, Shimane =

Former town in Shimane, Japan

Yokota (横田町, Yokota-chō) was a town located in Nita District, Shimane Prefecture, Japan.

As of 2003, the town had an estimated population of 7,000. The total area was 189.42 km^{2}

On January 31, 2005, Yokota, along with the town of Nita (also from Nita District), was merged to create the town of Okuizumo.
