= Actua Corporation =

Defunct venture capital firm

- Industry: Business-to-business
- Founded: March 4, 1996; 30 years ago
- Founder: Ken Fox; Buck Buckley
- Defunct: April 18, 2018; 8 years ago
- Fate: Underwent liquidation
- Headquarters: Radnor, Pennsylvania

Actua Corporation was a venture capital firm. During the dot com bubble, the company had a market capitalization of over $50 billion. The company was originally known as Internet Capital Group, Inc. and changed its name to Actua Corporation in September 2014. In April 2018, the company underwent liquidation.

== History ==
=== Incubator ===
In March 1996, Ken Fox, director of West Coast operations at Safeguard Scientifics, and Buck Buckley, a former vice president of acquisitions for Safeguard Scientifics, formed Internet Capital Group (ICG), a venture capital firm focused on business-to-business e-commerce. Fox saw the opportunity as "the biggest wealth-creation opportunity the world has ever seen". Following the "keiretsu" model used by Safeguard Scientifics, the company was heavily involved in the operations of the companies in which it invested and the start-ups would do business with each other.

One of ICG's first investments was a website called Water Online. Under the guidance of ICG, in late 1997, Water Online hired Mark Walsh, head of AOL's B2B division, as CEO. The company changed its name to VerticalNet, expanded, and became a public company, albeit with limited revenue. Unlike traditional venture capitalists, Buckley and Fox envisioned that ICG would hold most of its investments for ten years or longer.

In February 1999, the company converted to a C corporation. In May 1999, it raised $90 million of funding via a convertible bond issue.

In August 1999, the company became a public company via an initial public offering, offering 14.9 million shares at $12 each; shares doubled in value in their first day of trading. IBM bought 3.75 million shares at the IPO price of $12 per share and Dell Computer bought 1 million shares. Safeguard Scientifics was the largest shareholder. At the time of the IPO, ICG held stakes in 35 companies. At the end of its first month as a public company, boosted with buy recommendations from Henry Blodget, the stock traded at $58/share.

By December 1999, the stock was trading at over $200 per share, making Buckley and Fox billionaires on paper. The company was valued at nearly $60 billion, making it the 3rd largest Internet company by market capitalization behind AOL and Yahoo!. By then, the company had invested $300 million in 39 start-ups and had a staff of 29 people to manage and advise those companies. In the fourth quarter of 1999, GE Capital sold its shares in the company. In December 1999, the company raised over $1 billion in additional capital. That month, the company established a European operation, with an office in London. With a gain of 2733%, the stock was the best performing initial public offering of 1999.

By February 2000, the stock had declined 41% from its peak. That month, the company said it expects to see losses for the "foreseeable future". By early 2000, the company had invested $1.4 billion in 61 start-up firms. By April 2000, during the bursting of the dot-com bubble, its stock was trading at $35/share. In May 2000, the company invested $35 million to form an online patent exchange with IBM. Losses accelerated that year. By October 2000, the stock was trading at $9/share. In November 2000, the company announced plans to cut its staff by 35% and take a charge of $25 million to $30 million. It cut back its investments in Q3 2000 to $120 million, from $417 million in the previous quarter. By December 2000, the company had investments in 80 companies, all of which were involved in business-to-business Internet services.

In October 2001, after the September 11 attacks, the stock traded for 51 cents per share.

Two years after its peak in March 2000, the company had a market capitalization of $200 million, down 99.5%.

=== Liquidation ===
In February 2013, the company sold its stake in Channel Intelligence to Google for $60 million in proceeds. In December 2013, the company sold Procurian to Accenture for $375 million.

In September 2014, when the company changed its name to Actua Corporation, its stock was trading around $20 per share and was worth approximately $700 million.

In October 2016, the company sold Govdelivery to Vista Equity Partners for $153 million. In December 2017, the company sold its interests in VelocityEHS and Bolt Solutions for $328 million.

In January 2018, the company sold FolioDynamix for net proceeds of $166.3 million. In April 2018, the company underwent liquidation.
