= Michio Kushi =

Japanese macrobiotics entrepreneur (1926–2014)

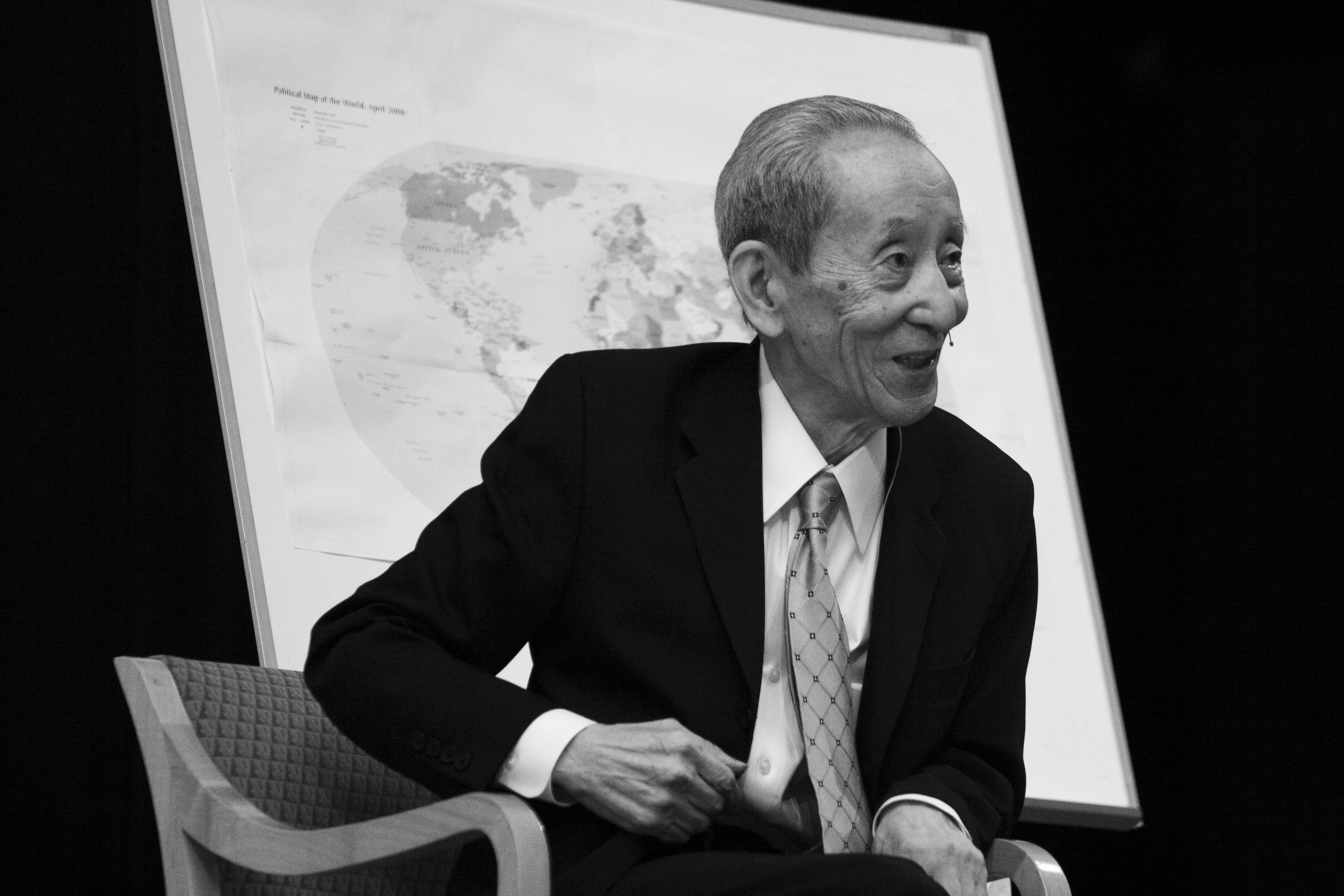
- Born: May 17, 1926; Kokawa, Wakayama, Japan
- Died: December 28, 2014 (aged 88); Boston, Massachusetts, U.S.
- Education: Political Science
- Alma mater: University of Tokyo
- Occupations: Author, Lecturer
- Known for: Introducing macrobiotics to the West & establishing wholefood industry
- Spouses: Aveline Kushi (m. 1954; died 2001) Midori Kushi (after 2001)
- Children: 5

Michio Kushi (久司 道夫, Kushi Michio) (May 17, 1926 – December 28, 2014) was a Japanese educator and alternative cancer treatment advocate who helped to introduce modern macrobiotics to the United States in the early 1950s. He lectured all over the world at conferences and seminars about the macrobiotic diet.

== Background ==
After World War II, Kushi studied in Japan with macrobiotic educator George Ohsawa. After going to America in 1949, Michio Kushi and Aveline Kushi, his wife, founded Erewhon Natural Foods, the East West Journal, the East West Foundation, the Kushi Foundation, One Peaceful World, and the Kushi Institute. They wrote over 70 books.

Kushi studied law and international relations at the University of Tokyo, and after going to America, he continued his studies at Columbia University in New York City. Aveline preceded him in death (2001), as did their daughter (1995). Michio Kushi lived in Brookline, Massachusetts. He died of pancreatic cancer on December 28, 2014, at the age of 88.

== Achievements ==
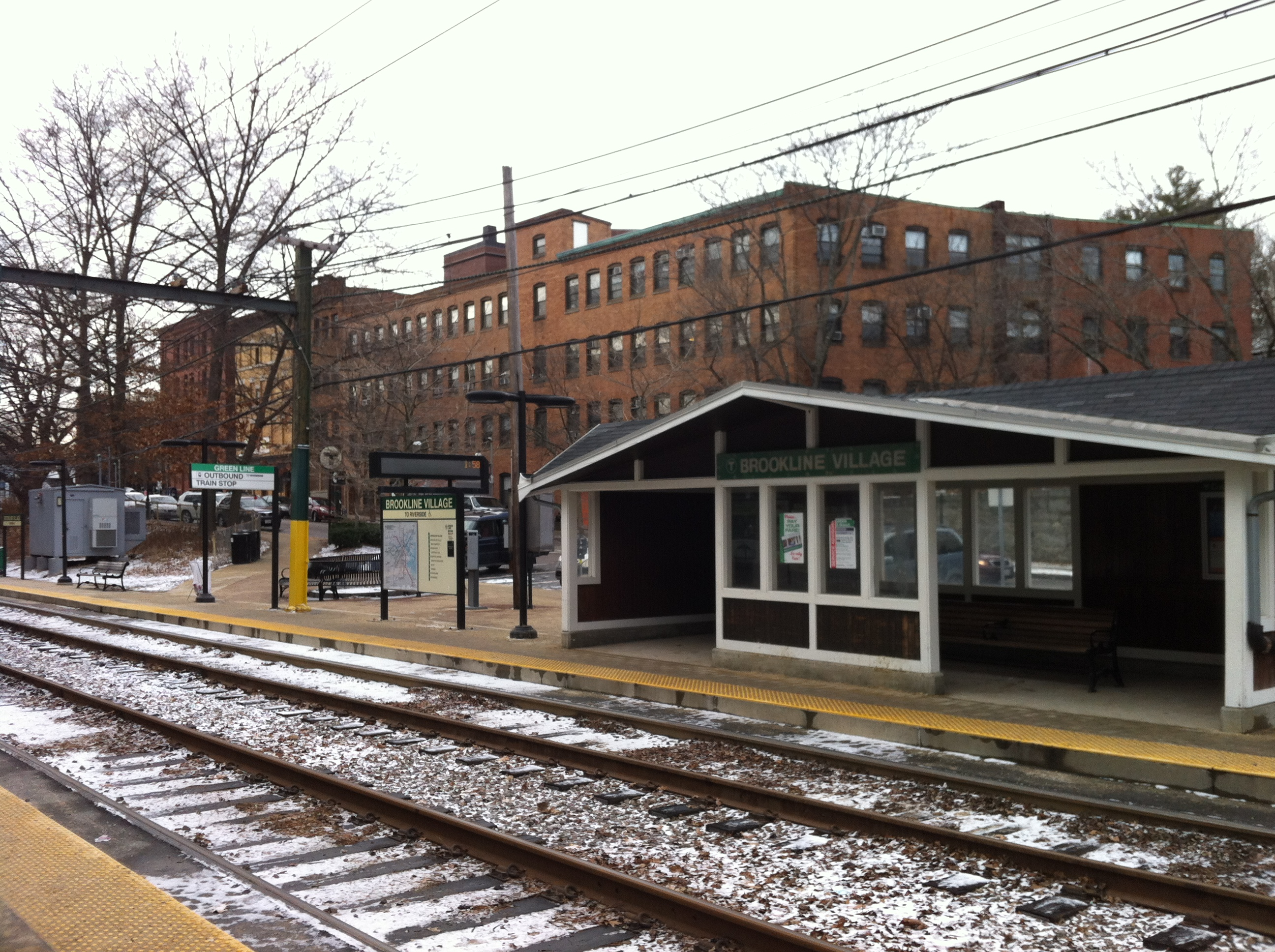
Former Kushi Institute building at 17 Station Street in Brookline Village, in background, adjacent to Brookline, MA MBTA D-Train stop

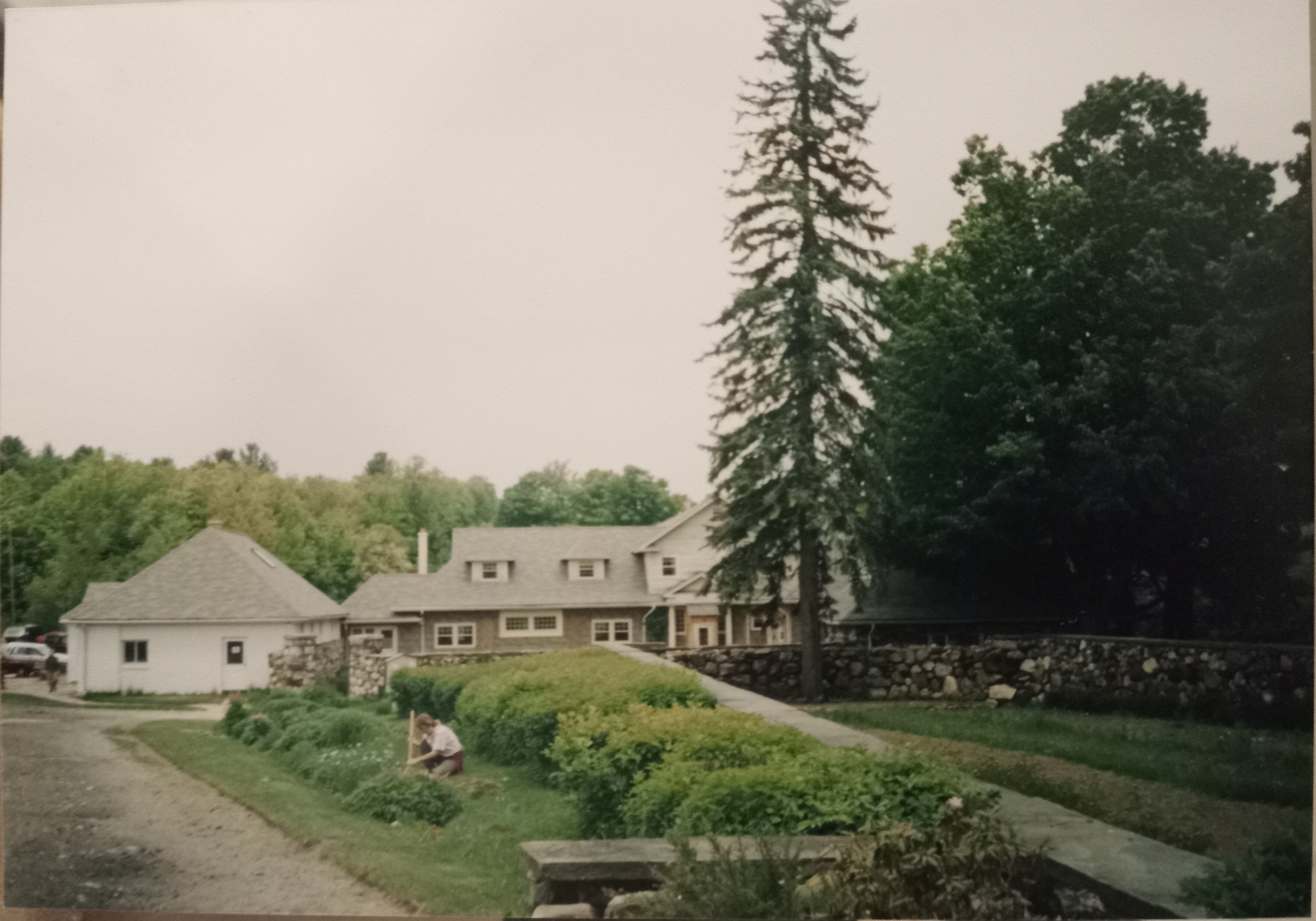
Kushi Institute, Becket, Massachusetts, 1996

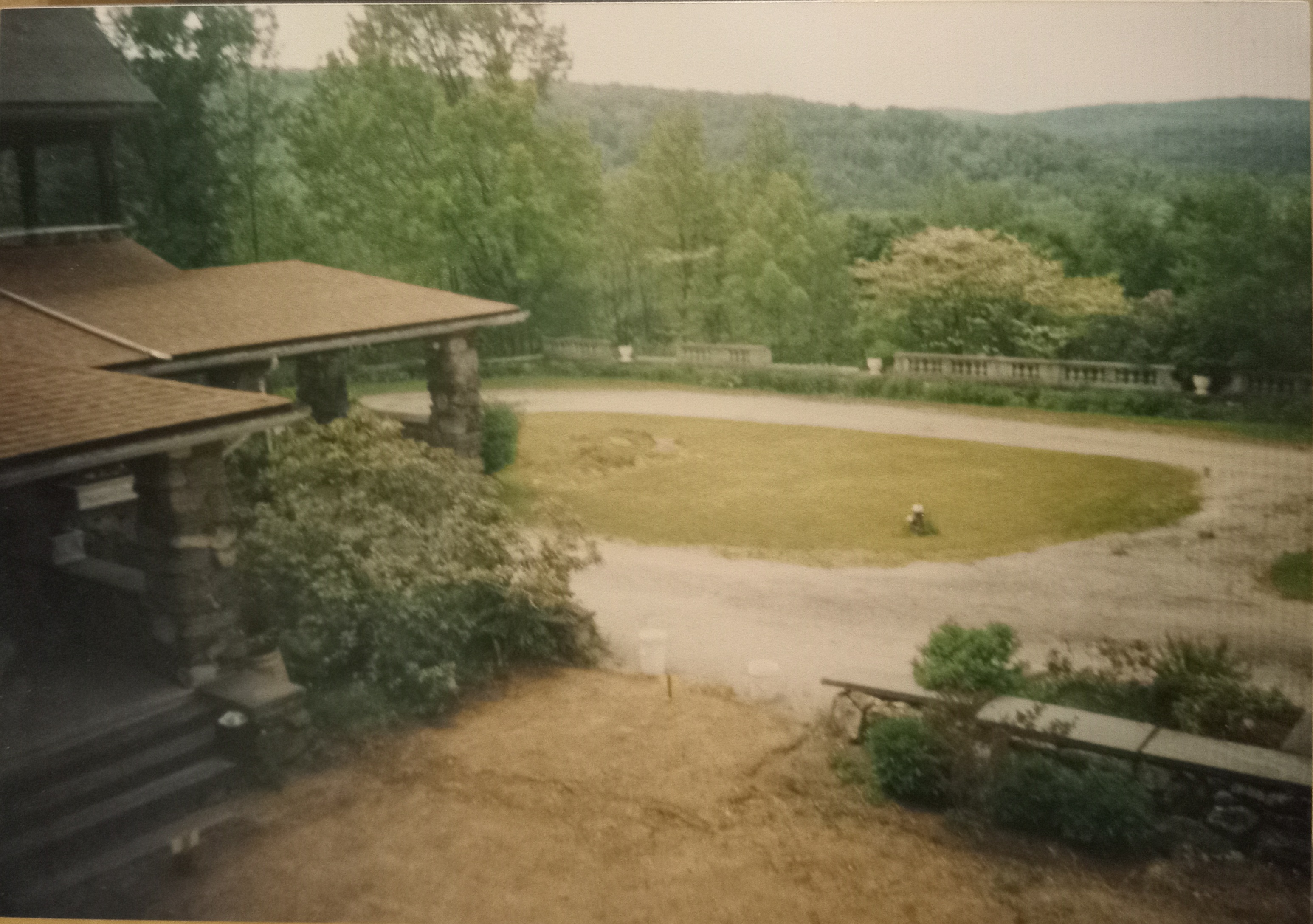
Kushi Institute, Becket, Massachusetts, 1996

- 1994 Kushi received the Award of Excellence from the United Nations Society of Writers.
- 1999 Mentioned in the Congressional record in recognition of the dedication and hard work to educate the world about the benefits of a macrobiotic diet.
- 1999 The Smithsonian Institution's National Museum of American History opened a permanent collection on macrobiotics and alternative health care in his name. The title of the collection is the "Michio and Aveline Kushi Macrobiotics Collection". It is located in the Archives Center.

Michio and his first wife Aveline were founders of The Kushi Institute, located in Becket, Massachusetts through 2016, but formerly in a converted factory building in Brookline Village, Massachusetts, adjacent to Mission Hill, Boston.

He and his first wife were awarded the Peace Abbey Courage of Conscience Award for their "extraordinary contribution to diet, health, and world peace, and for serving as powerful examples of conscious living", on October 14, 2000.

== Cancer ==
Kushi argued that conventional cancer treatments are "violent and artificial" and promoted his macrobiotic diet to treat cancer. There is no clinical evidence that the macrobiotic diet is effective to treat cancer. The American Cancer Society asked Kushi for documentation of his cancer claims. The reply contained no clinical data.

Two American nutritionists who have criticized Kushi's claim that a macrobiotic diet can cure cancer, Elizabeth Whelan and Frederick J. Stare , noted that:

Kushi's claim that cancer is largely due to his own versions of improper diet, thinking, and lifestyle is entirely without foundation. In his books, Kushi has recounted numerous case histories of persons whose cancer allegedly disappeared after following a macrobiotic diet. There are no available statistics on the outcome for all of these patients, but it is documented that at least some of them succumbed to their disease within a relatively short period. Reported testimonials of remission often uncovered the fact that the patients were also receiving conventional medical treatment at the same time.

== Selected publications ==
- 1976: Introduction to Oriental Diagnosis. Red Moon Publications. ISBN 9780906111000
- 1977: The Book of Macrobiotics. Japan Publications ISBN 9780870403811
- 1979: The Book of Do-In. Japan publications. ISBN 9780870403828
- 1979: Natural Healing Through Macrobiotics. Japan Publications; (December 1979) ISBN 9780870404573
- 1980: How to See Your Health: Book of Oriental Diagnosis. Japan Publications (USA) (December 1980) ISBN 9780870404672
- 1982: Cancer and Heart Disease: The Macrobiotic Approach to Degenerative Disorders. Japan publications. ISBN 9780870405150
- 1983: Your Face Never Lies. Wayne; (May 1, 1983) ISBN 9780895292148
- 1983: Macrobiotic Pregnancy and Care of the Newborn. Japan publications. ISBN 9780870405310
- 1983: The Cancer Prevention Diet. St Martin's Press. ISBN 9780722515402
- 1985: Macrobiotic Diet. Japan publications. ISBN 9780870405358
- 1985: Diabetes and Hypoglycaemia: A Natural Approach. Japan publications. ISBN 9780870406157
- 1986: Macrobiotic Child Care and Family Health. Japan publications. 1986. ISBN 9780870406126
- 1986: On the Greater View: Collected Thoughts and Ideas on Macrobiotics and Humanity. Wayne NJ. ISBN 9780895292698
- 1990: AIDS, Macrobiotics and Natural Immunity. Japan Publications. ISBN 978-0870406805
- 1990: The Gentle Art of Making Love. Avery Pub Group (May 1990) ISBN 9780895294357
- 1991: The Macrobiotic Approach to Cancer. Garden City Park. ISBN 9780895294869
- 1991: Macrobiotics and Oriental Medicine. Japan publications ISBN 9780870406591
- 1992: The Gospel of Peace : Jesus's Teachings of Eternal Truth. Japan publications. ISBN 9780870407970
