= George Ohsawa =

Japanese author and proponent of alternative medicine

- 櫻澤 如一
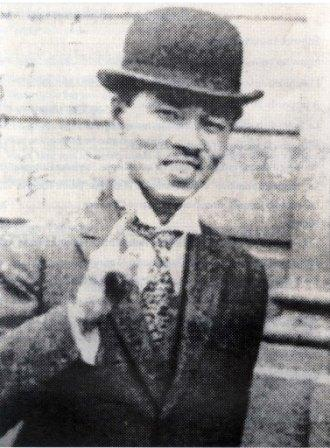
- Ohsawa in Paris, 1920
- Born: Nyoichi Sakurazawa; October 18, 1893; Shingu City, Wakayama Prefecture, Japan
- Died: April 23, 1966 (aged 72); Japan
- Occupations: Author, proponent of alternative medicine
- Known for: Founding the macrobiotic diet
- Movement: Macrobiotic diet, Pacifism

George Ohsawa (born Nyoichi Sakurazawa (櫻澤 如一); October 18, 1893 – April 23, 1966) was a Japanese author and proponent of alternative medicine who was the founder of the macrobiotic diet. When living in Europe he went by the pen names of Musagendo Sakurazawa, and Yukikazu Sakurazawa. He also used the French first name Georges while living in France, and his name is sometimes also given this spelling. He wrote about 300 books in Japanese and 20 in French. He defined health on the basis of seven criteria: lack of fatigue, good appetite, good sleep, good memory, good humour, precision of thought and action, and gratitude.

== Life ==
Ohsawa was born into a poor samurai family in Shingu City, Wakayama Prefecture. He had no money for higher education. Around 1913, he joined the Shokuiku movement, studying with Manabu Nishibata, a direct disciple of the late Sagen Ishizuka, in Tokyo. William Dufty describes the background ("Nyoiti" is a variant transcription of "Nyoichi"):

The gradual introduction of sugar into the Japanese diet brought in its wake the beginning of Western diseases. A Japanese midwife, trained in the techniques of Western medicine as a nurse, fell ill and was abandoned as incurable by the Western doctors she had espoused. Three of her children died the same way. The fourth, Nyoiti Sakurazawa, rebelled at the notion of dying of tuberculosis and ulcers in his teens. He took up the study of ancient Oriental medicine which had been officially outlawed in Japan. Sakurazawa was attracted to the unorthodox career of a famous Japanese practitioner, Dr. Sagen Ishizuka. Thousands of patients had been cured by Ishizuka (through traditional use of food) after they had been abandoned as incurable by the new medicine of the West.

Ohsawa claimed to have cured himself of tuberculosis at the age of 19 by applying the ancient Chinese concept of yin and yang as well as the teachings of Sagen Ishizuka.

Later he traveled in Europe and began to spread his philosophy in Paris. It was in this period that he adopted his pen name "Ohsawa", supposedly from the French Oh, ça va, which means "All right" or "I'm doing fine" as a reply to the question "how are you doing?"). After several years, he returned to Japan to start a foundation and gather recruits for his now formalized philosophy. In 1931, he published The Unique Principle explaining the yin and yang order of the universe.

After drawing attention during World War II for his pacifist ideals, he wrote a book that predicted Japan's defeat, writing: "I ask Japan's ruling class to remember...those responsible in France were shot to death," emphasizing the wartime outbreaks of disease and hunger. Over 100,000 copies were distributed before he was incarcerated and tortured by the Kempeitai in May and faced continued violence from the police, right-wing groups, and military. In 1942 war with the US began. After being freed from prison by U.S. General MacArthur, he moved his institution to a remote area in the mountains of Yamanashi Prefecture.

In 1961, he wrote Zen Macrobiotic, referring to the macrobiotic diet that had been advocated by Christoph Hufeland in Germany since 1796. Subsequently, the philosophy of Ohsawa has been referred to as macrobiotics.

While he was in France, Ohsawa wrote a number of books in French, which were published by Vrin Publishers in Paris. Among them were L'Ere Atomique et la Philosophie d'Extrême-Orient (The Atomic Age and the Philosophy of the Far East), written during the Cuban Missile Crisis. In this book, as in all the books Ohsawa wrote, he devoted considerable space to explaining how macrobiotics can shed light on many social problems as well as the causes of war, and help bring about a world in which war will be seen as an outcome of an error of judgment, and discarded as an effective solution to social conflict.

Ohsawa also created a stir by predicting the deaths of several notable people, including John F. Kennedy based on the condition known in Japan as "sanpaku" (literally "three whites"), a traditional Japanese physiognomic diagnosis in which a white area below as well as to each side of the iris appears when the eye is viewed straight on. This anomaly was considered a sign of extreme fatigue that made one accident-prone and slow to react. Samurai were trained to watch for this feature to assist in determining how formidable an enemy would be in hand-to-hand combat. Ohsawa used this diagnosis in his teachings and adapted it as a more general diagnostic indication of one's general state of health. The assassination of President Kennedy led Tom Wolfe to write:

Abdul Karim Kassem, Ngo Dinh Diem, and President Kennedy, all sanpaku and, now, shot to death, all destroyed by the fate of the sanpaku, which is more than coincidence and should be an alarm signal to men and nations, say the Macrobiotics, for thus it has been demonstrated by their leader, George Ohsawa, Japanese prophet of the Unique Principle.

This article caught the attention of William Dufty, who, finding relief in the brown rice diet recommended by Ohsawa, became an advocate of macrobiotics, and traveled to Paris to meet with Ohsawa and publisher Felix Morrow. Ohsawa handed Dufty a package, and said, "Here is a lifetime of writing. Do your best with them. It's your turn." In 1965 Morrow's firm, University Books, published Ohsawa's writings under the provocative title You Are All Sanpaku.

== Death ==
Ohsawa died of a heart attack in 1966 at the age of 72.

== Books ==
The following bibliography of the writings of George Ohsawa is from page 218 of You Are All Sanpaku:

- 1931: Le Principe unique de la philosophie et de la science d’Extrême-Orient, Paris: Vrin.
- 1932: Le Livre des fleurs, Paris: Plon.
- 1952: Le Livre du Judo, Tokyo: Sekai Seihu.
- 1954: The Two Great Indians in Japan, Sri Rash Benhari Bose and Netaji Subhas Chandra Bose, India: Sri K. C. Das.
- 1956: Jack et Madame Mitie en Occident, Paris: E.D.
- 1956: La Philosophie de la médecine d'Extrême-Orient, Paris: Vrin.
- 1961: Zen macrobiotique, Bruxelles: I.D.M..
- 1961: Acupuncture macrobiotique, Paris: Sésame.

Translations by Ohsawa

- T. Nakayama (1934): Acupuncture et médecine chinoise vérifiées au Japon, Paris : Le Francois.

=== Japanese works ===
- Macrobiotics
- History of China From 2000 B.C. Until Today
- Franklin: A physiological and biological biography
- Gandhi: A physiological and biological biography
- Clara Schumann and Her Father: A physiological and biological Study
- Translation and critique: The Encounter Between East and West by F. S. C. Northrup
- Translation and critique: Man the Unknown by Alexis Carrell
- The Fatality of Science

== See also ==
- Japanese resistance to the Empire of Japan in World War II
