= Macrobiotic diet =

Fad diet fixed on ideas about types of food drawn from Zen Buddhism

Alternative medicine
- Claims: Health effects from a diet avoiding refined foods and most animal products. Specific effects on cancer
- Related fields: Diet
- Original proponents: Sagen Ishizuka
- Subsequent proponents: George Ohsawa; Michio Kushi; William Dufty; Edward Esko

A macrobiotic diet (or macrobiotics) is a restrictive dietary regime based on ideas about types of food drawn from Zen Buddhism. The diet tries to balance the food elements classified as yin and yang, a practice that also extends to cookware. Major principles of macrobiotic diets are to reduce animal products, eat locally grown foods that are in season, and consume meals in moderation.

There is no high-quality clinical evidence that a macrobiotic diet is helpful for people with cancer or other diseases, and it may be harmful. Neither the American Cancer Society nor Cancer Research UK recommends adopting the diet. Deaths have been reported from malnutrition on strict macrobiotic diets.

== Conceptual basis ==
Macrobiotic diets are based on the concept of balancing yin and yang.

The macrobiotic diet is associated with Zen Buddhism and is based on the idea of balancing yin and yang. The diet proposes ten plans which are followed to reach a supposedly ideal yin:yang ratio of 5:1. The diet was popularized by George Ohsawa in the 1930s and subsequently elaborated on by his disciple Michio Kushi. Medical historian Barbara Clow writes that macrobiotics takes a view of illness and of therapy which conflicts with mainstream medicine.

Macrobiotics emphasizes locally grown whole grain cereals, pulses (legumes), vegetables, edible seaweed, fermented soy products, and fruit combined into meals according to the ancient Chinese principle of balance known as yin and yang. Some macrobiotic proponents stress that yin and yang are relative qualities that can only be determined in a comparison. All food is considered to have both properties, with one dominating. Foods with yang qualities are considered compact, dense, heavy, and hot, whereas those with yin qualities are considered expansive, light, cold, and diffuse. However, these terms are relative; "yangness" or "yinness" is only discussed in relation to other foods.

Brown rice and other whole grains such as barley, millet, oats, quinoa, spelt, rye, and teff are considered by macrobiotics to be the foods in which yin and yang are closest to being in balance. Therefore, lists of macrobiotic foods that determine a food as yin or yang generally compare them to whole grains.

Nightshade vegetables (including tomatoes, peppers, potatoes, and eggplant), spinach, beets, and avocados are not recommended or are used sparingly in macrobiotic cooking, as they are considered extremely yin. Some macrobiotic practitioners also discourage the use of nightshades because of the alkaloid solanine which is thought to affect calcium balance. Some proponents of a macrobiotic diet believe that nightshade vegetables can cause inflammation and osteoporosis.

=== History ===
Macrobiotics was founded by George Ohsawa and popularized in the United States by his disciple Michio Kushi. In the 1960s, the earliest and most strict variant of the diet was termed the "Zen macrobiotic diet" which claimed to cure cancer, epilepsy, gonorrhea, leprosy, syphilis and many other diseases. Ohsawa wrote that dandruff is "the first step toward mental disease". Ohsawa wrote about the diet in his 1965 book Zen Macrobiotics. The Zen macrobiotic diet involved 10 restrictive stages with the highest stage eliminating all foods in the diet apart from whole grains. Fluid intake was discouraged at all stages.

In 1965, a young follower of the macrobiotic diet died from malnutrition. George Ohsawa was sued for malpractice and the Ohsawa Foundation in New York was closed after a raid by the Food and Drug Administration. In 1966, a Grand Jury who reviewed several cases of death from malnutrition among macrobiotic proponents concluded that the diet "constitutes a public health hazard". In 1967, the first case report of scurvy on the macrobiotic diet was reported. In 1971, the American Medical Association's Council on Foods and Nutrition commented that followers of the diet were in "great danger" of malnutrition. Their report concluded that "when a diet has been shown to cause irreversible damage to health and ultimately lead to death, it should be roundly condemned as a threat to human health".

After the Ohsawa Foundation in New York was closed, Michio Kushi shifted operations to Boston, where he opened two macrobiotic restaurants. In the 1970s, Kushi established the East West Journal, the East West Foundation and the Kushi Institute. In 1981, the Kushi Foundation was formed as a parent organization for the institute and magazine. The Kushi Institute was located on a large site in Becket, Massachusetts where it hosted macrobiotic conferences, lectures and seminars. Kushi combined macrobiotics with numerous paranormal and pseudoscientific ideas including auras, astrology, chakras, oriental physiognomy, palmistry and extra-terrestrial encounters. The Kushi Institute closed in 2017.

== Practices ==
=== Food ===
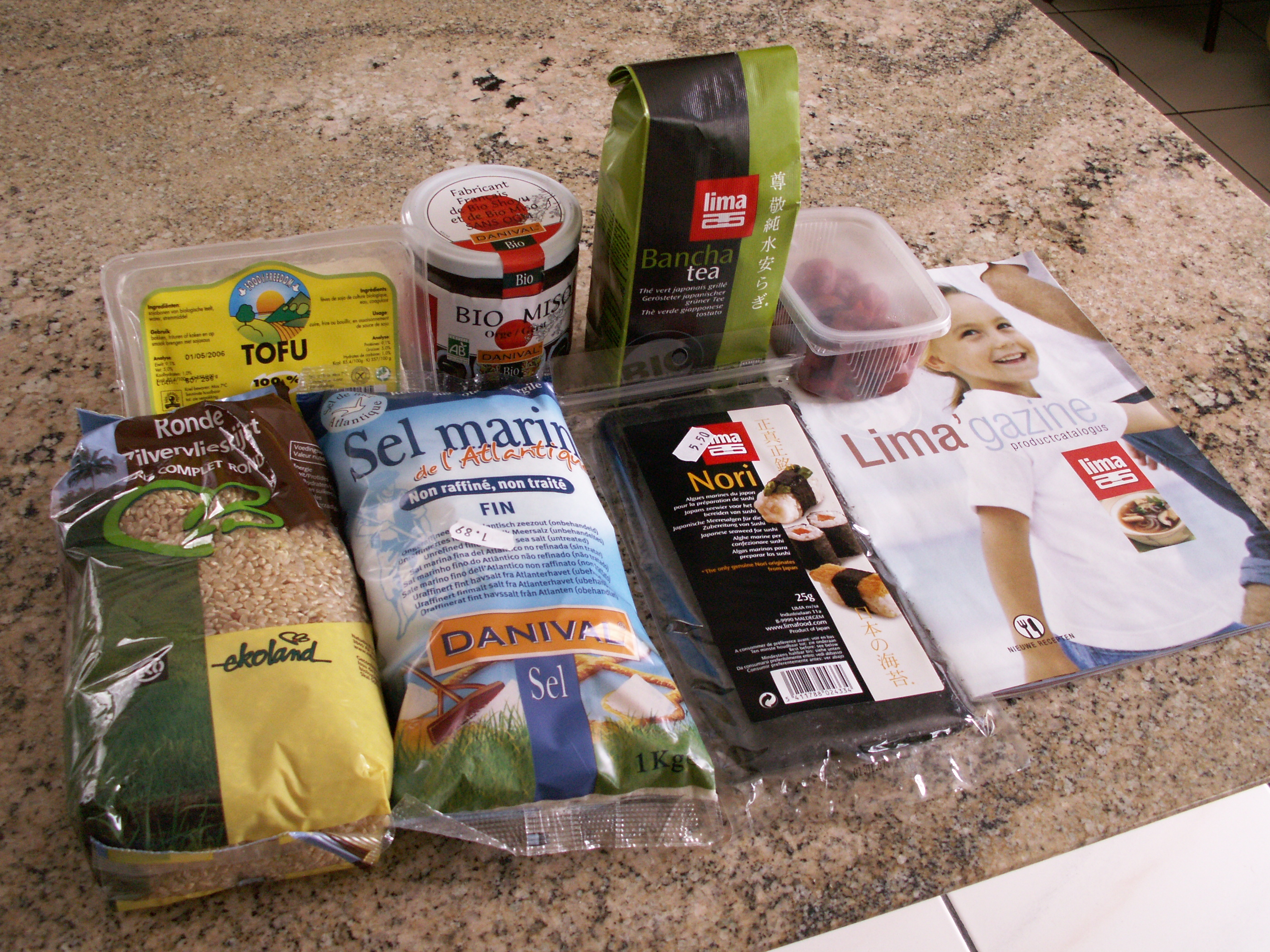
Some basic macrobiotic ingredients

The macrobiotic diet is considered an unconventional or fad diet. Some general guidelines for the macrobiotic diet are the following.

- Whole cereal grains, especially brown rice: 50–60%
- Vegetables: 20–30%
- Beans and sea vegetables : 5–10%

Small amounts of white fish and fruit may be eaten if desired. Nuts and seeds are not often consumed but are permitted as occasional snacks if they are lightly roasted. Beverages include herbal teas, cereal-grain coffee and roasted-barley tea.

=== Kitchenware ===
Cooking utensils should be made from certain materials such as wood or glass, while some materials including plastic, copper, and non-stick coatings are to be avoided. Electric ovens should not be used.

== Cancer ==
The macrobiotic diet has been advertised as an alternative cancer treatment but is ineffective to treat any type of cancer. Macrobiotics author Michio Kushi argued that conventional cancer treatments are "violent and artificial" and the macrobiotic diet should not be combined with conventional treatment. There is no clinical evidence to support the cancer claims of macrobiotic proponents. The American Cancer Society who reviewed 11 scientific data bases found no peer-reviewed evidence that the macrobiotic diet is effective for treating any type of cancer. The Office of Technology Assessment, examining both published and unpublished macrobiotic literature, failed to verify any claims of cancer cure.

The American Cancer Society recommends "low-fat, high-fiber diets that consist mainly of plant products"; however, they urge people with cancer not to rely on a dietary program as an exclusive or primary means of treatment. Cancer Research UK states, "some people think living a macrobiotic lifestyle may help them to fight their cancer and lead to a cure. But there is no scientific evidence to prove this."

== Safety ==
=== Regulation ===
Macrobiotic practitioners are not regulated, and need not have any qualification or training in the United Kingdom.

=== Complications ===
One of the earlier versions of the macrobiotic diet that involved eating only brown rice and water has been linked to severe nutritional deficiencies and even death. Strict macrobiotic diets that include no animal products may result in nutritional deficiencies unless they are carefully planned. The danger may be worse for people with cancer, who may have to contend with unwanted weight loss and often have increased nutritional and caloric requirements. Relying on this type of treatment alone and avoiding or delaying conventional medical care for cancer may have serious health consequences.

Cases of vitamin B12 and iron-deficiency anemias have been reported as a result of the diet.

=== Children ===
Children may also be particularly prone to nutritional deficiencies resulting from a macrobiotic diet. A macrobiotic diet does not contain the nutrients needed by growing children.

=== Pregnancy ===
Macrobiotic diets have not been tested in women who are pregnant or breast-feeding, and the most extreme versions may not include enough of certain nutrients for normal fetal growth.

== See also ==
- Ch'i
- Chinese food therapy
- List of diets
- List of unproven and disproven cancer treatments
- Sanpaku
- Shiatsu
- Traditional Chinese medicine
