= Choemon Masataka Tanabe =

Japanese television executive (born 1979)

25th (第二十五代) Choemon Masataka Tanabe
- 田部 長右衛門 真孝
- Born: Masataka Tanabe; August 4, 1979 (age 47); Yoshida, Iishi-gun, Shimane, Japan
- Education: Chuo University (BEc)
- Occupation: 25th head of the Tanabe family
- Years active: 2002–present
- Organization(s): Representative Director, Tanabe Art Museum; Chairperson, the Matsue Chamber of Commerce and Industry
- Television: Kamaitachi no Okite
- Predecessor: 24th Choemon Tomohisa Tanabe
- Board member of: Representative Director and President, Tanabe Corporation; Representative Director and President, San-in Chuo Television Broadcasting Co., Ltd.
- Parent(s): 24th Choemon Tomohisa Tanabe (father); Yoko Tanabe (mother)
- Relatives: 23rd Choemon Tomoyuki Tanabe (grandfather); Heibei Sakaguchi II (grandfather); 22nd Choemon Shigeaki Tanabe (great-grandfather); Heibei Sakaguchi I (great-grandfather); Masahiro Yonehara (uncle-in-law); Kyojiro Hata (uncle-in-law); Soshu Sen (uncle-in-law); Heibei Sakaguchi III (cousin); Nobuhiko Sakaguchi III (cousin); So-oku Sen (cousin)

Choemon Masataka Tanabe (田部 長右衛門 真孝, born August 4, 1979) is a Japanese business magnate, one of Japan's largest private forest owners, owner of a ranch, investor, media proprietor, mass media heir, and television executive. He is the 25th head of the Tanabe family, one of the "Tatara Big Three" in Japan's San'in region. He serves as representative director and President of Tanabe Corporation and San-in Chuo Television Broadcasting Co., Ltd., commonly known as TSK. His commonly used name and legal name is "Choemon Tanabe (田部 長右衛門)".

His grandfather is the 23rd Choemon Tomoyuki Tanabe, who was a former governor of Shimane Prefecture, and his father is the 24th Choemon Tomohisa Tanabe.

== Biography ==
In 1979, Choemon Masataka Tanabe was born as "Masataka Tanabe (田部 真孝)" in Yoshida Village, Iishigun, Shimane Prefecture (now Unnan City, Shimane Prefecture), to the 24th Choemon Tomohisa Tanabe, and Yoko Tanabe, the fourth daughter of Heibei Sakaguchi, the second-generation Heibei Sakaguchi, a businessman and member of the House of Representatives. He graduated from Shimane Prefectural Matsue Kita High School and from the Faculty of Law, Department of Political Science at Chuo University. During his time at university, his father, Choemon Tomohisa Tanabe, died unexpectedly due to an internal illness.

In April 2002, he joined Fuji Television Network, Inc. Among his peers were former Fuji Television announcers Minako Nakano and Hitomi Nakamura. He was assigned to the news department, where he served as a director for News Japan, the evening news program of the Fuji News Network (FNN), and as a correspondent for the FNN New York Bureau. Subsequently, he worked in the Network Sales Division of the Sales Department, overseeing advertising sales for the entire Fuji Network System (FNS), and in the Accounting Department, where he was responsible for the company's financial statements.

At the age of 30, in 2010, he left Fuji Television and returned to Shimane. In April of the same year, he assumed the position of Representati

In 2015, following the passing of his predecessor, Tomohisa Tanabe, he succeeded to the title of "Choemon (長右衛門)", a title that had remained vacant for 16 years, thus becoming the 25th Choemon Masataka Tanabe.

In 2016, he was appointed as the representative director and president of San-in Chuo Television Broadcasting Co., Ltd. (commonly referred to as "TSK"), which was founded by his father, and he actively pursued business expansion. Currently, TSK's consolidated sales have exceeded 20 billion yen, continuing on a growth trajectory.

In 2018, he revived the ancestral business of tatara, which had been dormant for approximately 100 years.

In October 2019, following the resignation of Makoto Koga, a special advisor at THE SAN-IN GODO BANK, LTD. who had served as the chairman of the Matsue Chamber of Commerce and Industry for nearly nine years, he was appointed as the youngest chairman in the organization's history.

In November 2022, he acquired the sake brewing business from the Takeshita family, which was facing a succession crisis, and established Tanabe Takeshita Brewery, re-entering the sake brewing business after nearly 150 years.

== Professional Experience ==
- April 2002 - Joined Fuji Television Network, Inc. (currently known as Fuji Media Holdings, Inc.) (Note: In October 2008, Fuji Television Network, Inc. (the former entity) transitioned to a certified broadcasting holding company and changed its name to Fuji Media Holdings, Inc. Through a company split, the television broadcasting operations were transferred to the newly established Fuji Television Network, Inc. (the new entity).)
- April 2010 - Representative Director and president, Tanabe Corporation (to date)
- April 2010 - Representative Director and President, Jutoku Industries Co., Ltd.
- April 2010 - Representative Director and President, Shoyo Printing Inc. (to date)
- June 2010 - Managing Director, San-in Chuo Television Broadcasting Co., Ltd.
- April 2011 - Representative Director, THE TANABE MUSEUM OF ART FOUNDATION (to date)
- June 2011 - Representative Director and President, JUTOKU CORPORATION (to date)
- June 2011 - Outside Director, THE SAN-IN GODO BANK, LTD.
- June 2012 - Representative, Green Power Unnan LLC. (to date)
- February 2014 - Representative Director and President, Izumo Yumura Onsen Co., Ltd. (to date)
- May 2014 - Representative Director and President, Danobeta International CO., LTD.
- June 2014 - Senior Executive Managing Director, San-in Chuo Television Broadcasting Co., Ltd.
- June 2016 - Representative Director and President, San-in Chuo Television Broadcasting Co., Ltd. (to date)
- January 2018 - Chairperson and Depresentative Director, Matsuko Corporation (to date)
- December 2018 - Non-Executive Director, The San-in Chuo Shimpo Newspaper Co., Ltd. (to date)
- November 2019 - Chairperson, the Matsue Chamber of Commerce and Industry (to date)
- October 2020 - Representative Director and chairperson, TANABE Global Kitchen, Inc. (to date)
- October 2021 - Representative Director and Satoosa, TANABE TATARANOSATO, INC. (to date)
- June 2022 - Managing Director and Owner, Tanabe Takeshita Brewery, Inc.
- 2025 - Representative Director, President and Owner, Tanabe Takeshita Brewery, Inc. (to date)
- February 7, 2025 - Representative Director and Chairperson, Tanabe no Takumi, Inc. (to date)
- April 2025 - Representative Director and Chairperson, Yoneda Sake Brewery Co., Ltd. (to date)
- May 1, 2025 - Representative Director and President, TANABE PKG, INC. (to date)
- January 28, 2026 - Director and Chairman Emeritus, Nisshin Ringyo Co., Ltd. (to date)

== History of Tanabe ==
=== Origins ===
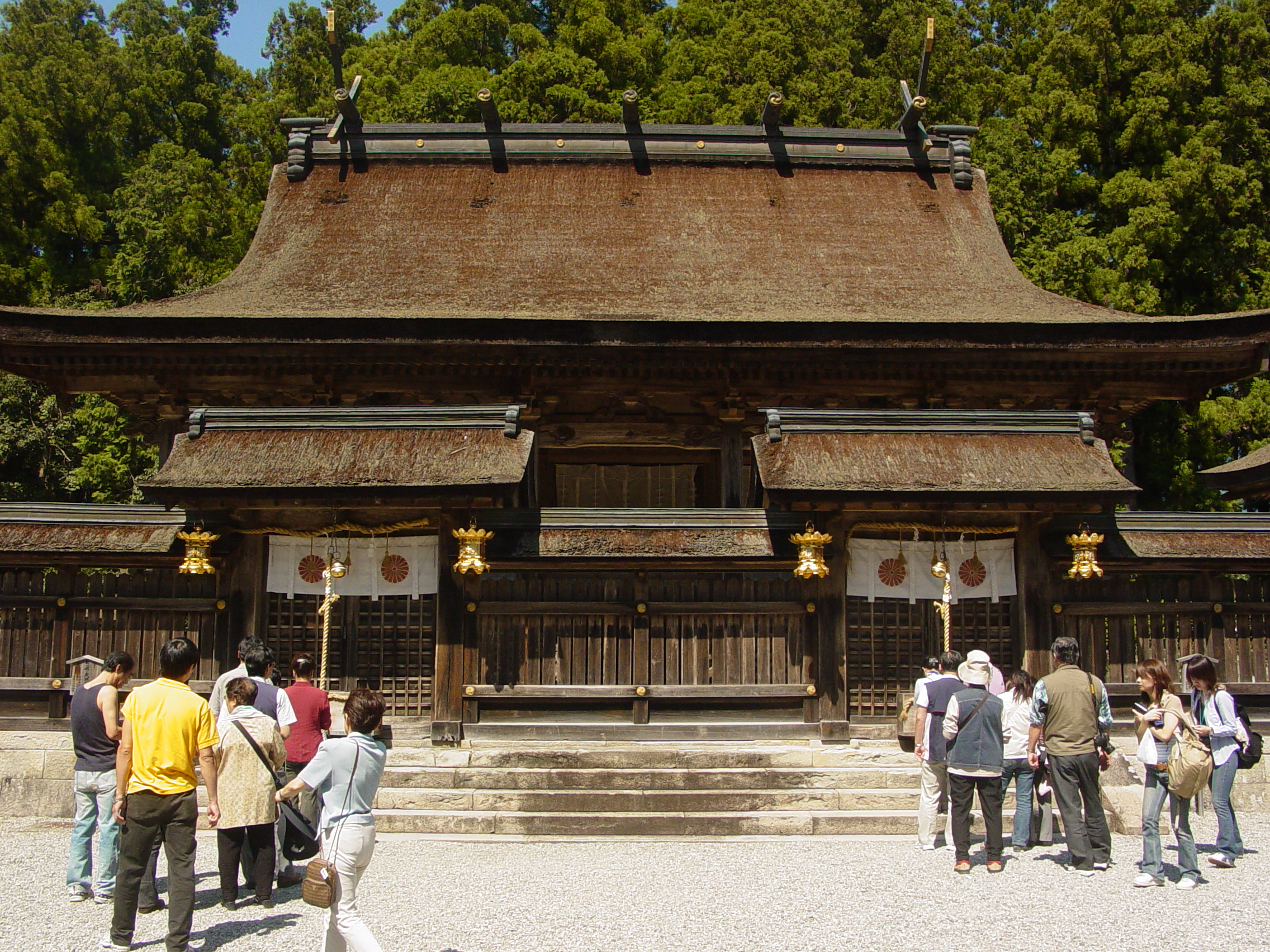
Honden of Kumano Hongu Taisha, Tanabe, Wakayama

The ancestors were part of a separate branch of the Tanabe clan (田辺家) in Kishu-Kumano Region (currently Wakayama Prefecture), and it is said that Hayatonosho Tanabe (田辺 隼人正), the grandson of Tanzo Tanabe (田辺 湛増), who served as Kumano-Betto, (Note: A position responsible for overseeing the Kumano Sanzan: Kumano Hongu Taisha, Kumano Hayatama Taisha, and Kumano Nachi Taisha.) served as a vassal to the Yamanouchi-Sudo clan (山内周藤家) under the command of Minamoto no Yoritomo. In 1246, Hayatonosho Tanabe's descendant, Anzainyudo Tanabe (田辺 安西入道), moved to Yoshida Village and served as a samurai for 11 generations. In 1460, Hikozaemon Tanabe (田辺 彦左衛門) began gathering iron sand and started tatara ironmaking. The Tanabe clan considers this Hikozaemon Tanabe the first generation. They refer to him as the "Tetsuzan-Ganso (鉄山元祖)".

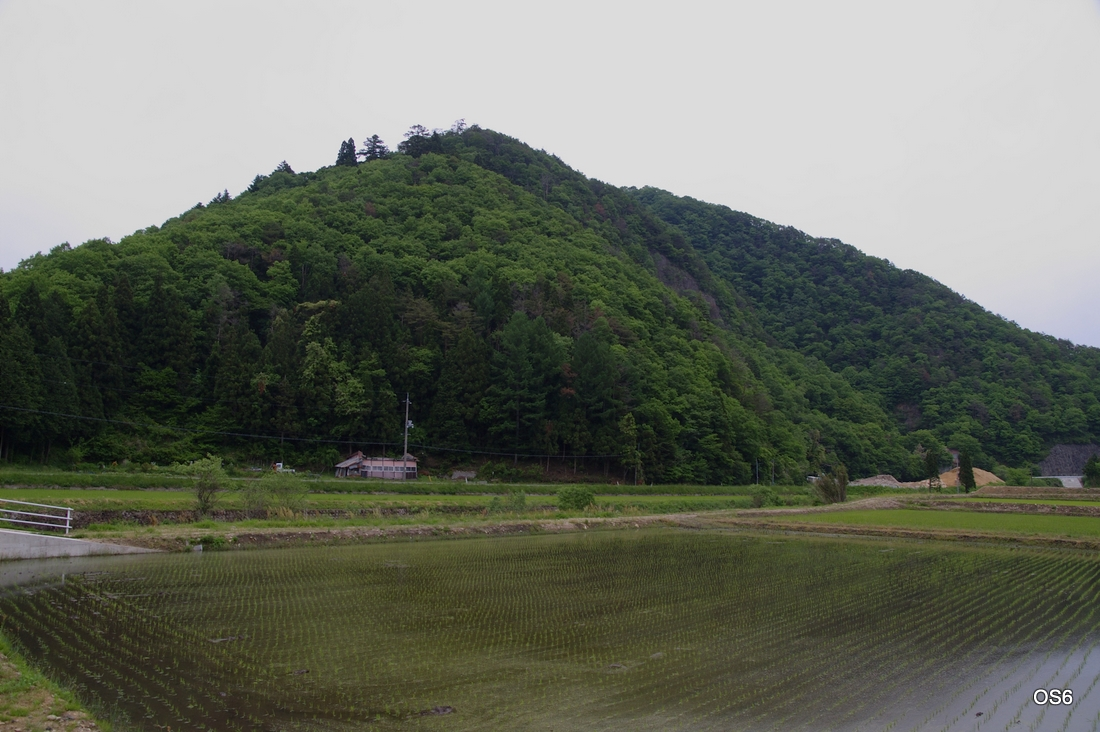
Shitomiyama Castle Ruins, Takano, Shobara, Hiroshima

During the time of the 4th generation, Sozaemon Michimasa Tanabe (田辺 惣左衛門 通政), due to warfare, the family could no longer conduct ironmaking, so they moved to Shitomiyama Castle (currently Takano-cho, Shobara City, Hiroshima Prefecture) with the entire clan.

=== Revival of Tatara in the Early Edo Period ===
In the early Edo period, the 6th generation, Yosobei Michitoshi Tanabe (田辺 與三兵衛 通年), returned to Yoshida Village and revived the tatara ironmaking. With the introduction of the board bellows, iron productivity improved. The Tanabe clan genealogy records this Yosobei Tanabe as the "Tetsuzan-Chukou (鉄山中興)". In 1646, they established the first Eitai tatara in Abawara. The Eitai Tatara, which allowed year-round indoor operations, ran until 1688. Around the same time, several smithy were established. In 1662, the family purchased nine Machiya (Traditional Japanese wooden townhouses) in Yoshida Village.

=== The Prosperity of the Tanabe Clan: "Maewataya" ===
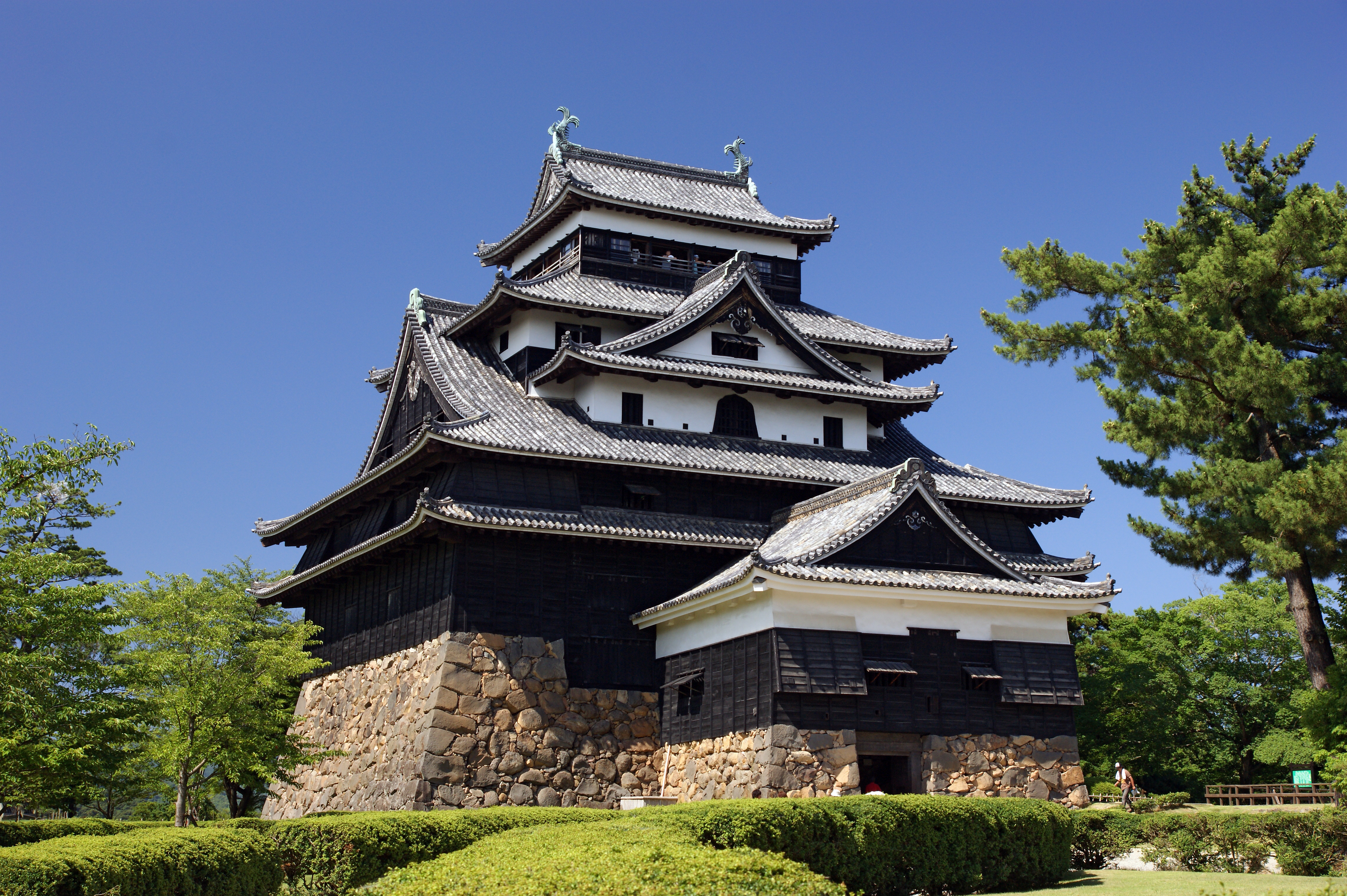
Matsue Castle in Matsue, Shimane

During the era of the 9th generation, Yasuemon Kunitoshi Tanabe (田辺 安右衛門 邦年), the family genealogy records, "鉄山益々繁昌 金銀如山 米穀満庫 (meaning: The iron mountain flourished, gold and silver piled like mountains, and granaries were full of rice)". They received the house name "Maewataya (前錦屋)" from the Matsue Domain and changed their family name from "田辺" to "田部". (Note: The pronunciation remains unchanged as 'Tanabe,' as it has been previously.) The family crest (Kamon) "Maewatayamon (前錦屋紋)" continues to be used today as the corporate identity of the Tanabe Group companies. The 10th generation, Choemon Gannnen Tanabe (田部 長右衛門 元年), received the name "Choemon (長右衛門)" from the Matsue Domain. From this point on, the heads of the Tanabe clan took on the name "Choemon" successively, establishing the family's firm position.

In 1751, Sugaya Tatara was founded. Today, Sugaya Tatara Sannai still preserves the production facility called "Tanadono (高殿)", where tatara ironmaking once operated, and it is designated as an Important Tangible Folk Cultural Property of Japan. The Tanadono, which produced the world's highest-quality steel for about a century until operations ceased on May 5, 1923, is still visitable, along with other facilities such as "Motogoya (元小屋)", which served as an office for iron mountain management, and "Tataraba (たたら場)", where large chunks of iron produced by tatara were crushed. The "Tataraba" was the model for the ironworks in Studio Ghibli's animated film Princess Mononoke.

In 1755, the 12th generation, Choemon Motoyoshi Tanabe (田部 長右衛門 元義), was appointed as Tesshi Todori (鉄師頭取), overseeing the iron mountains in Okuizumo. In 1780, the Edo Shogunate established the "Tetsuza (鉄座)" (iron monopoly agency), which led to a decline in iron prices, greatly affecting the Tanabe clan. The Tetsuza was abolished in 1785. In 1787, the 7th lord of the Matsue Domain, Harusato Matsudaira, visited the family. In 1796, the Matsue Domain ordered 54,400 kg of pig iron from the Aizu Domain, which was transported to Niigata by Kitamaebune and then delivered to Aizu via the Aganogawa River. From 1802 to 1825, the records show that they operated an average of 87 times a year, with each operation lasting 72 hours, meaning operations were nearly continuous throughout the year. In 1811, the 8th lord of the Matsue Domain, Naritsune Matsudaira, visited. In 1862, the price of iron skyrocketed.

In 1866, the 6th generation of the Takeshita clan, Rihachi Takeshita (竹下 理八), a village headman (shoya) under the Tanabe clan, inherited the family's sake brewing rights. According to records from 1828, the Tanabe clan produced 396 koku (*1 koku is approximately 180 liters) of sake in Yoshida Village and 360 koku in Shirakata, a castle town of Matsue Castle (currently Shirakata-honmachi, Matsue City).

From the Edo period to the Meiji period, the Tanabe clan's forestry holdings expanded to 25,000 hectares at their peak (equivalent to the entire area of present-day Osaka City). Additionally, they owned 1,000 hectares of farmland, had 1,000 tenant households, and possessed 1,000 cattle and horses. In 1865, a fire destroyed two-thirds of Yoshida Village, leading to the relocation of the family's main house to its current location.

=== Meiji Restoration and the End of Tatara ===
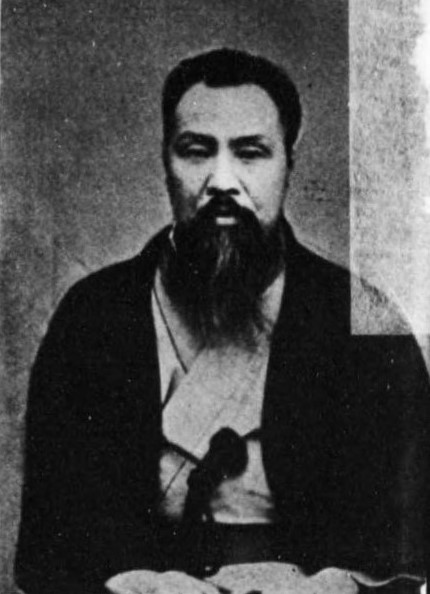
21st Choemon Nagaaki Tanabe (1850–1942), prior to 1912

After the Meiji Restoration, the Matsue Domain was abolished under the Haihan-Chiken, and the protectionist policies which had supported the iron industry for over 100 years were repealed. In 1873, the Japanese Mining Law came into effect, imposing new taxes on gold dust extraction. Moreover, the large-scale import of cheap Western iron after the opening of Japan and the domestic introduction of blast furnace ironmaking put pressure on tatara ironmaking. In such a challenging business environment, the Tanabe showcased "Tamahagane (玉鋼)" at the Chicago and Paris Expositions as part of their promotional efforts, earning high praise worldwide for its quality. However, they could not resist the wave of efficiency and large-scale production, and in 1923, the 21st generation, Choemon Nagaaki Tanabe (田部 長右衛門 長秋), closed the tatara ironmaking operations.

=== 23rd generation, Choemon Tomoyuki Tanabe ===
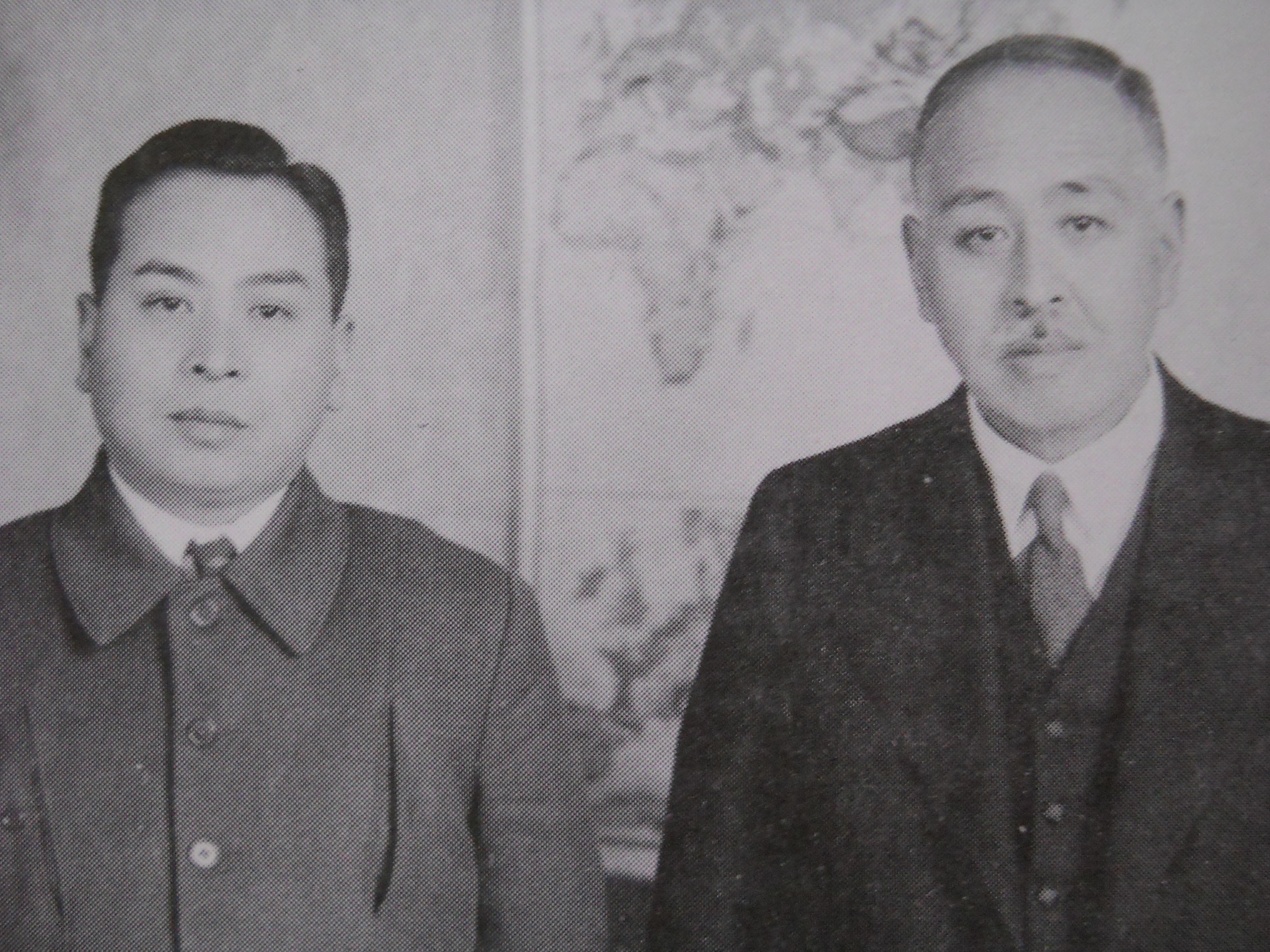
23rd Choemon Tomohisa Tanabe (left) and 22nd Choemon Shigeaki (right), 1942

The 23rd generation, Choemon Tomoyuki Tanabe (田部 長右衛門 朋之), who graduated from the Faculty of Economics at Kyoto Imperial University in 1933, pursued early modernization of management. After World War II, he established Tanabe Forestry Co., Ltd. (田部林産有限会社), the predecessor of the current Tanabe Corporation (株式会社田部), contributing to the development of the forestry and plywood industries. He also devoted himself to social service activities, including establishing the Matsu-no-ya Hospital (松之舎病院) with his own funds. The hospital was later managed by the prefecture and became the Shimane Prefectural Central Hospital. He also contributed to the development of local media by merging with a struggling local newspaper to form the Shimane Shimbun Co., Ltd., which later changed its name to "The San-in Chuo Shimpo Newspaper Co., Ltd.". Additionally, he entered politics, becoming a member of the House of Representatives in 1942 and serving as the Governor of Shimane Prefecture for three terms, totaling 12 years, from 1959 after World War II. He supported Noboru Takeshita, the 74th Prime Minister of Japan, and Mikio Aoki, who wielded significant power in Japan's House of Councillors. Noboru Takeshita was a descendant of the Takeshita clan, and Mikio Aoki served as the secretary to the 23rd-generation Choemon Tomoyuki Tanabe during his time as Governor of Shimane Prefecture.

=== 24th generation, Choemon Tomohisa Tanabe ===
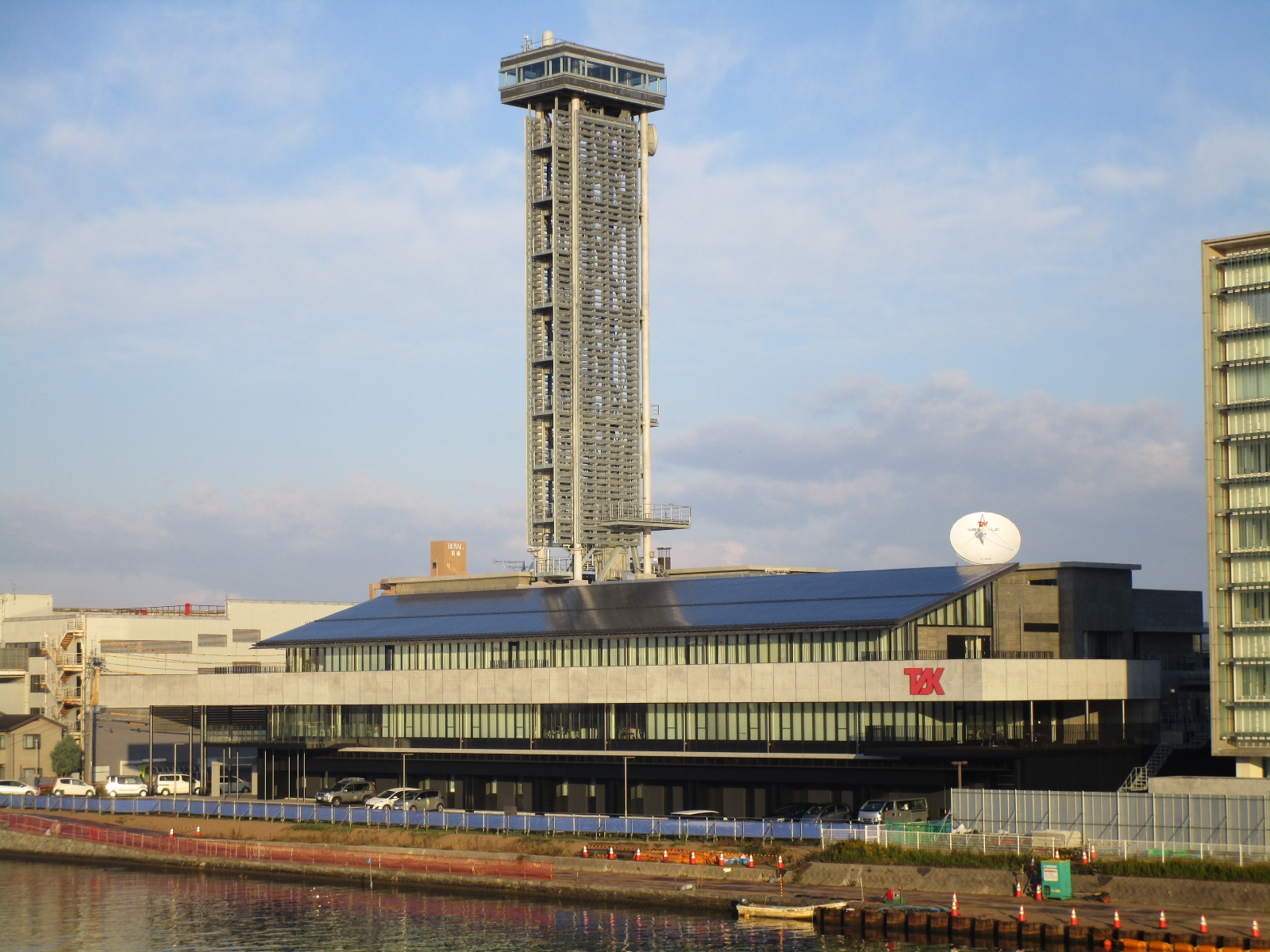
TSK Broadcasting Center in Mukojima-cho, Matsue, Shimane - Operational since 2016

The 24th generation, Choemon Tomohisa Tanabe (田部 長右衛門 智久), became president of the Tanabe Group companies following his father's appointment as Governor of Shimane Prefecture. In 1969, he became the first president of Shimane Broadcasting Co., Ltd. (abbreviated as TSK). Due to the efforts of Noboru Takeshita, who played a key role in the company's establishment and had a long-standing relationship with Nobutaka Shikanai, the founder of the Fujisankei Communications Group, the company joined the Fuji Network System (FNS), with Fuji Television Network, Inc. as its key station. In 1972, the broadcasting area was expanded to Tottori Prefecture, and the company changed its name to San-in Chuo Television Broadcasting Co., Ltd. (no change in abbreviation). He also acquired the exclusive franchise rights for Kentucky Fried Chicken in the Chugoku region and expanded the business into the information systems sector. He died at the young age of 61 on November 7, 1999. Kazuhiko Aoki, the eldest son of Mikio Aoki and current member of the House of Representatives, served as the secretary to the 24th-generation Choemon Tomohisa Tanabe.

=== 25th generation, Choemon Masataka Tanabe ===
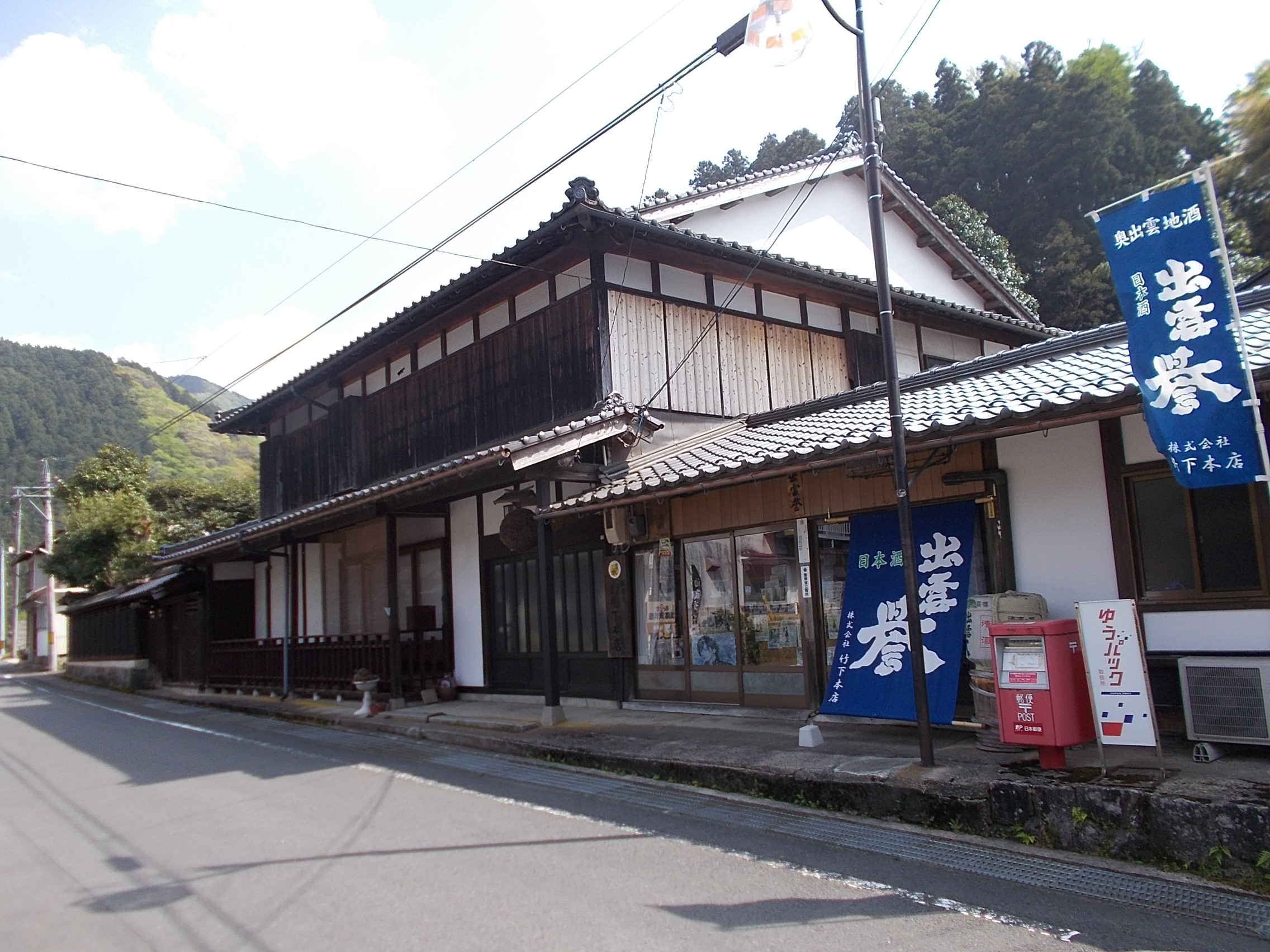
The headquarters of Tanabe Takeshita Brewery and Noboru Takeshita's family home in Kakeya, Unnan, Shimane, previously the headquarters of Takeshita Honten Co., Ltd.

The current head of the family, the 25th generation, Choemon Masataka Tanabe (田部 長右衛門 真孝), joined Fuji Television Network, Inc. before becoming the president of Tanabe Corporation in 2010. In 2015, he took on the name "Choemon". The following year, in 2016, he became president of San-in Chuo Television Broadcasting Co., Ltd. In May 2018, he revived tatara ironmaking after 100 years. Additionally, on November 1, 2022, he acquired the sake brewing business from the Takeshita family, which was facing a succession crisis, and established Tanabe Takeshita Brewery, re-entering the sake brewing business after nearly 150 years.
