= Akagi, Shimane =

Town in Iishi District, Shimane Prefecture, Japan

Akagi (赤来町, Akagi-chō) was a town located in Iishi District, Shimane Prefecture, Japan.

As of 2003, the town had an estimated population of 3,372 and a density of 28.58 persons per km^{2}. The total area was 117.98 km^{2}.

On January 1, 2005, Akagi, along with the town of Tonbara (also from Iishi District), was merged to create the town of Iinan.
