= Daitō, Shimane =

Dissolved municipality in Ōhara district, Shimane prefecture, Japan

Daitō (大東町, Daitō-chō) was a town located in Ōhara District, Shimane Prefecture, Japan.

As of 2003, the town had an estimated population of 14,327 and a density of 94.11 persons per km^{2}. The total area was 152.23 km^{2}.

On November 1, 2004, Daitō, along with the towns of Kamo and Kisuki (all from Ōhara District), the towns of Kakeya and Mitoya, and the village of Yoshida (all from Iishi District), was merged to create the city of Unnan.

The town's sister city is Richmond, Indiana, USA.
