= Kisuki Station =

Railway station in Unnan, Shimane Prefecture, Japan

Kisuki Station 木次駅
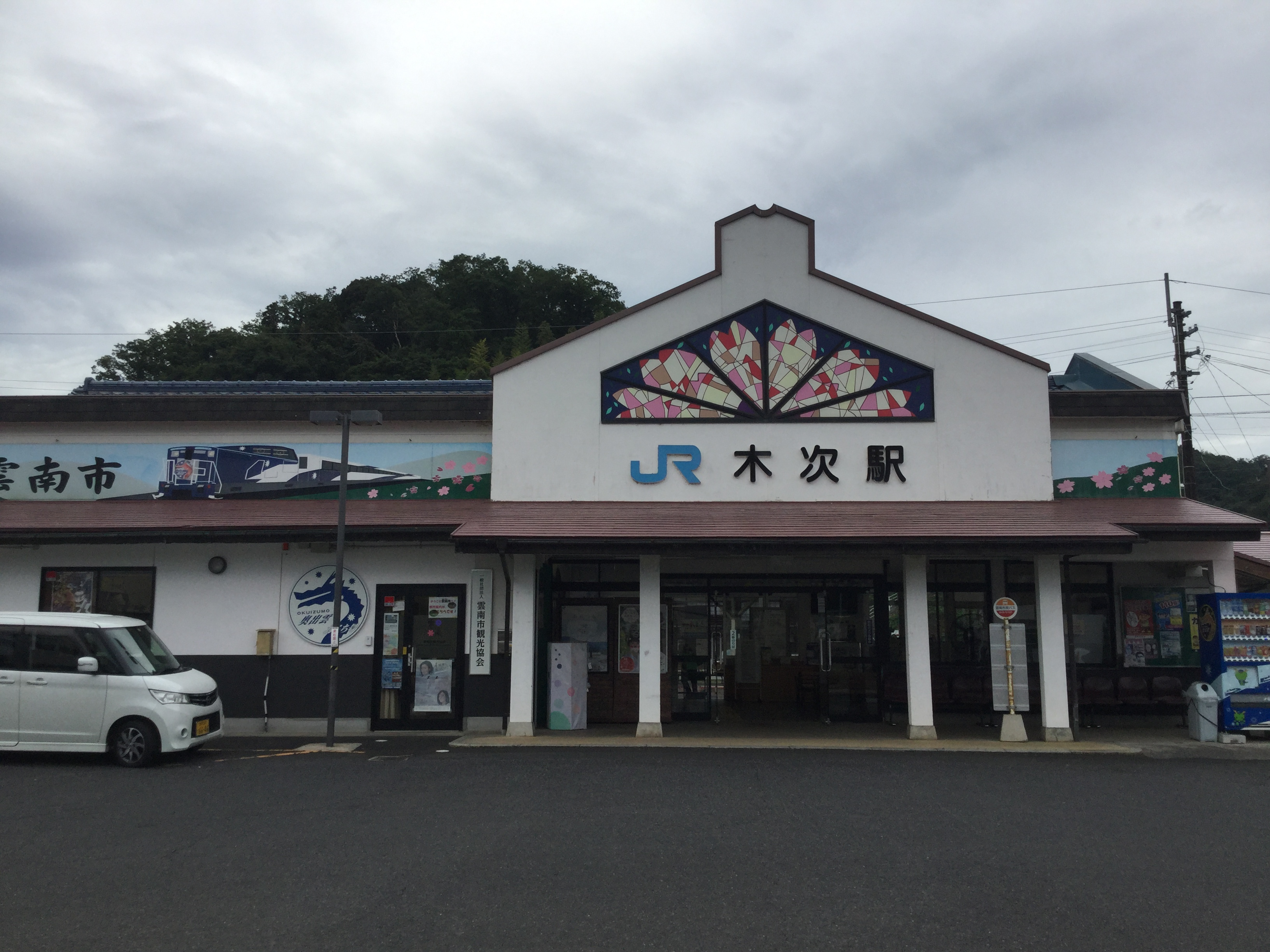
- Kisuki Station, August 2019

General information
- Location: 26, Kisuki-chō Satogata, Unnan-shi, Shimane-ken 699-1311; Japan
- Coordinates: 35°17′40.74″N 132°54′7.02″E
- Operator: JR West
- Line: E Kisuki Line
- Distance: 21.1 km (13.1 miles) from Shinji
- Platforms: 2 side platforms
- Tracks: 2

Other information
- Status: Staffed
- Website: Official website

History
- Opened: 11 October 1916

Passengers
- 2020: 95 daily

Services
Preceding station	JR West	Following station
Minami Daitō towards Shinji	Kisuki Line	Hinobori towards Bingo Ochiai
Location
- Location within Shimane Prefecture Location within Japan

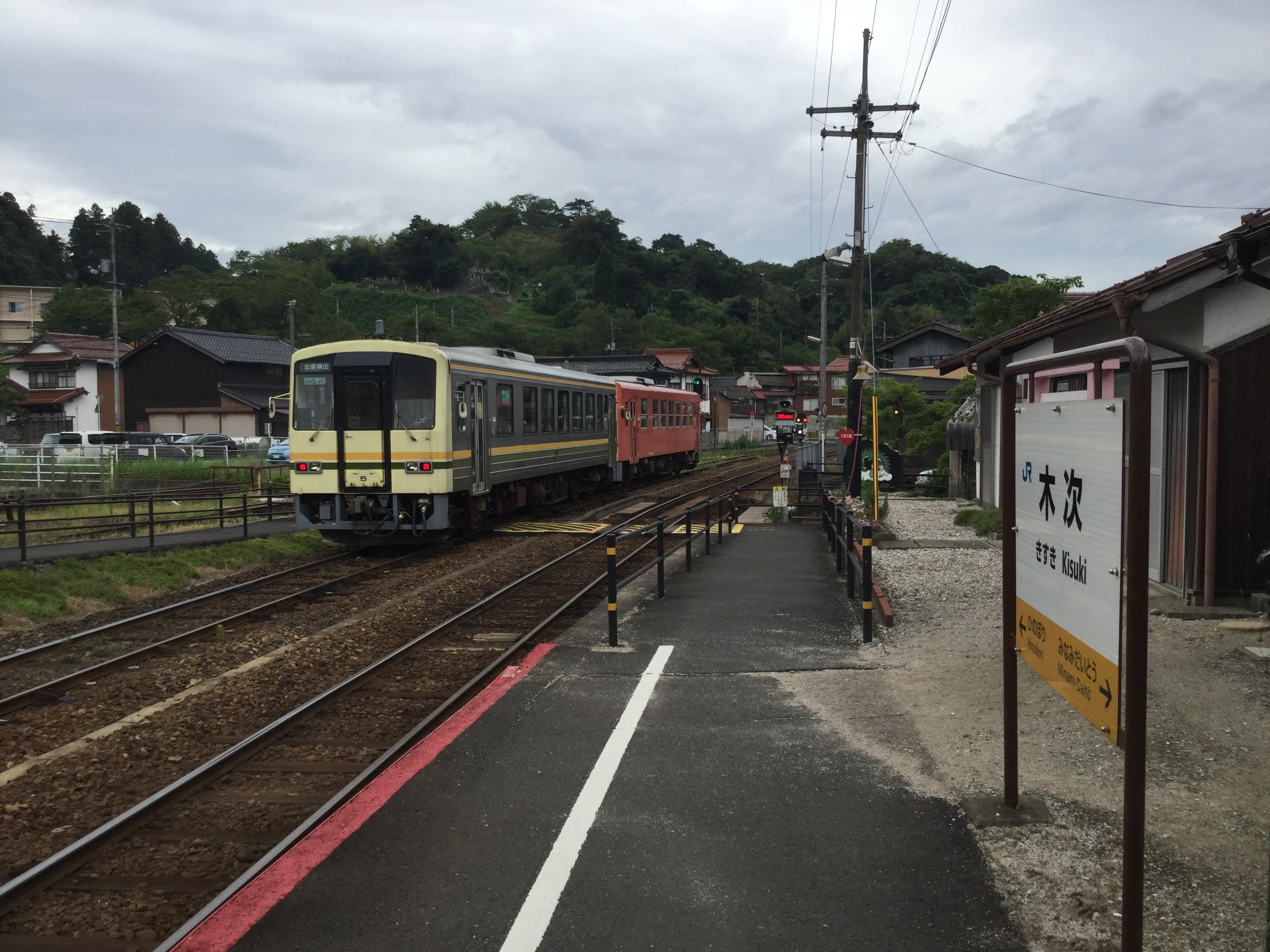
Station platforms

Kisuki Station (木次駅, Kisuki-eki) is a passenger railway station located in the city of Unnan, Shimane Prefecture, Japan. It is operated by the West Japan Railway Company (JR West).

== Lines ==
Kisuki Station is served by the Kisuki Line, and is located 21.1 kilometers from the terminus of the line at Shinji.

== Station layout ==
The station consists of two ground-level opposed side platforms connected by a level crossing. The station building is staffed, and is the only station directly operated by JR West on the Kisuki Line.

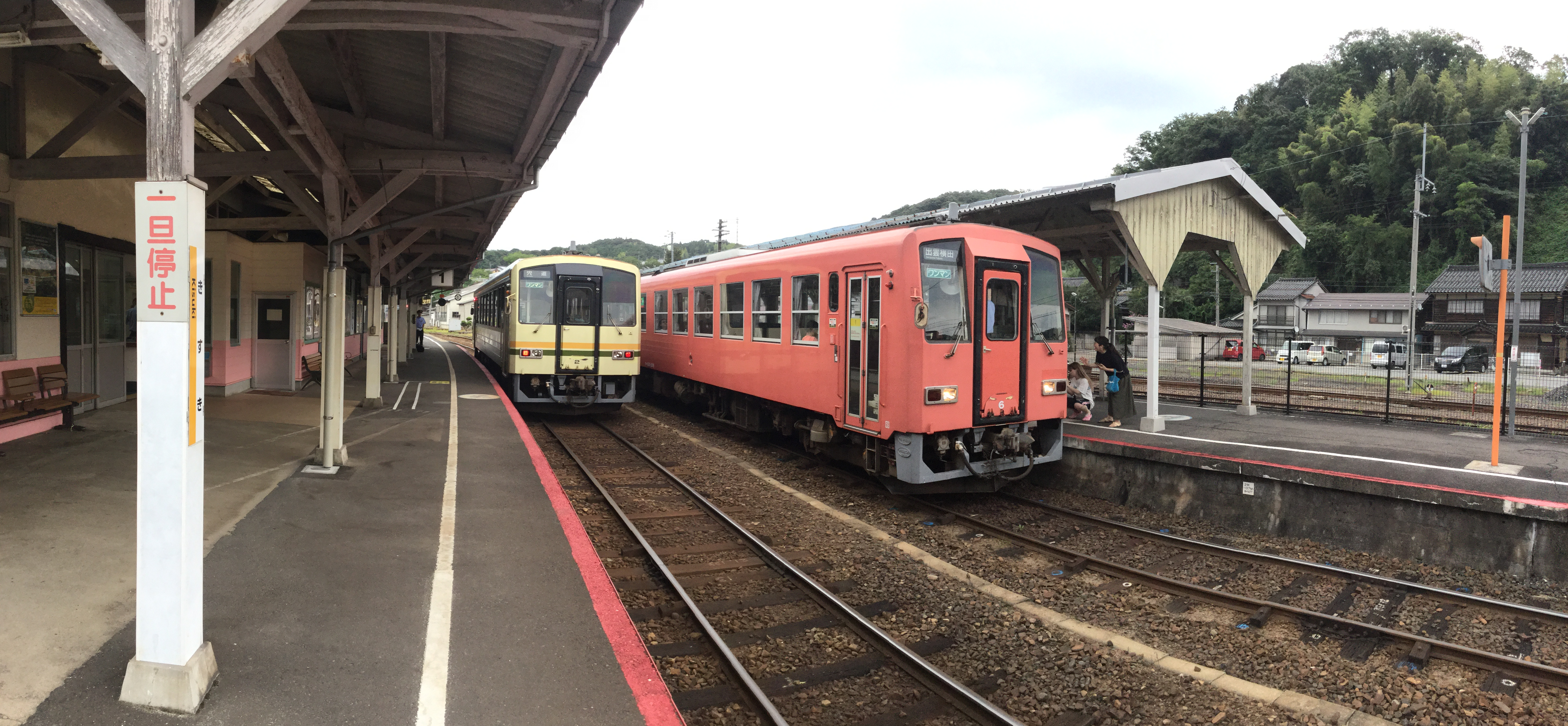
Station platforms and trains, 2019

=== Platforms ===
1	■ E Kisuki Line	for Shinji
2	■ E Kisuki Line	for Izumo Yokota and Bingo-Ochiai

== History ==
Kisuki Station was opened on 11 October 1916 as the terminus of the Hinokami Railway. The railway was nationalized on 12 December 1932, becoming the Kisuki Line, and the line was extended to Izumo Minari Station. It became part of JR West on 1 April 1987 when Japan National Railways was privatized.

== Passenger statistics ==
In fiscal 2019, the station was used by an average of 95 passengers daily.

== Surrounding area ==
- Unnan Tourism Association
- Hii River Embankment

== See also ==
- List of railway stations in Japan
