= Iishi District, Shimane =

District in Shimane prefecture, Japan

Coordinates: 35.046°N 132.766°E

Location of Iishi District in Shimane Prefecture

Iishi (飯石郡, Iishi-gun) is a district located in Shimane Prefecture, Japan.

As of 2003, the district had an estimated population of 20,864 and a density of 38.00 persons per km^{2}. The total area is 242.84 km^{2}.

== Towns and villages ==
- Iinan

== Mergers ==
- On November 1, 2004, the towns of Kakeya and Mitoya, and the village of Yoshida, merged with the towns of Daitō, Kamo and Kisuki, all from Ōhara District, to form the new city of Unnan.
- On January 1, 2005, the towns of Akagi and Tonbara merged to form the new town of Iinan.
