= Ohara District, Shimane =

Former district in Shimane prefecture, Japan

Ōhara (大原郡, Ōhara-gun) was a district located in Shimane Prefecture, Japan.

== Population ==
In 2003, the district had an estimated population of 30,838 and a density of 124.74 persons per km^{2}. The total area was 247.21 km^{2}.

== Towns and villages ==
- Daitō
- Kamo
- Kisuki

== Merger ==
- On November 1, 2004, the towns of Daitō, Kamo and Kisuki merged with the towns of Kakeya and Mitoya, and the village of Yoshida, all from Iishi District, to form the new city of Unnan. Ohara District was dissolved as a result.
