= Kamo, Shimane =

Dissolved municipality in Ōhara district, Shimane prefecture, Japan (1934–2004)

Kamo (加茂町, Kamo-machi) was a town located in the former Ōhara District, Shimane Prefecture, Japan.

As of 2003, the town had an estimated population of 6,621 and a density of 214.20 persons per km^{2}. The total area was 30.91 km^{2}.

On November 1, 2004, Kamo, along with the towns of Daitō and Kisuki (all from Ōhara District), the towns of Kakeya and Mitoya, and the village of Yoshida (all from Iishi District), was merged to create the city of Unnan.
