= Iinan, Shimane =

Iinan 飯南町
- Town
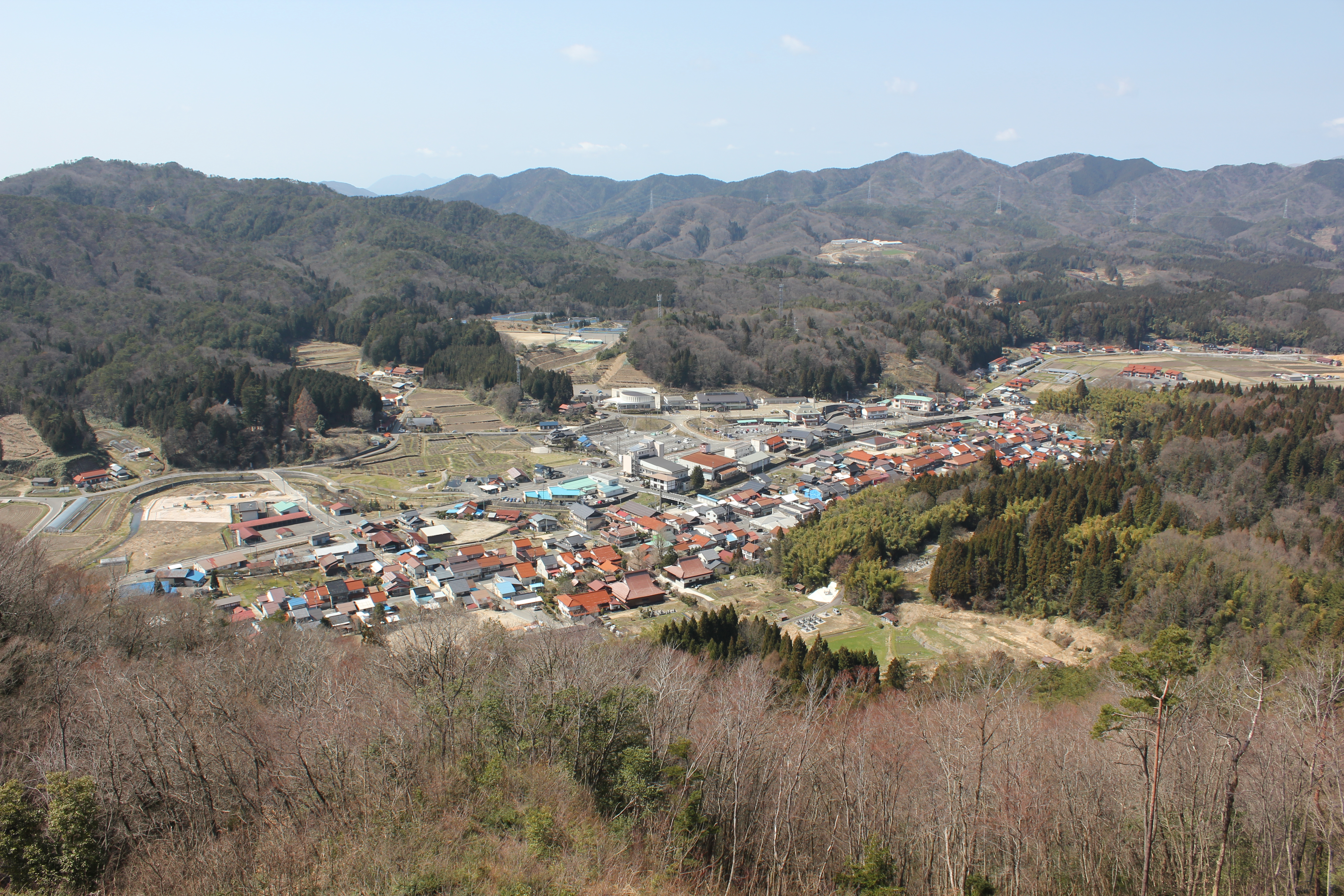
- The town of Iinan.

- Flag Emblem
- Interactive map of Iinan
- Location in Japan
- Coordinates: 35°0′0″N 132°42′50″E
- Country: Japan
- Region: Chūgoku; San'in
- Prefecture: Shimane
- District: Iishi

Area
  - Total: 242.88 km^{2} (93.78 sq mi)

Population (August 1, 2023)
  - Total: 4,502
  - Density: 18.54/km^{2} (48.01/sq mi)
- Time zone: UTC+09:00 (JST)
- City hall address: 890 Shimoakana, Iinan-machi, Shimane-ken 690-3513
- Climate: Cfa
- Website: www.iinan.jp
- Symbols
- Flower: Peony
- Tree: Beech

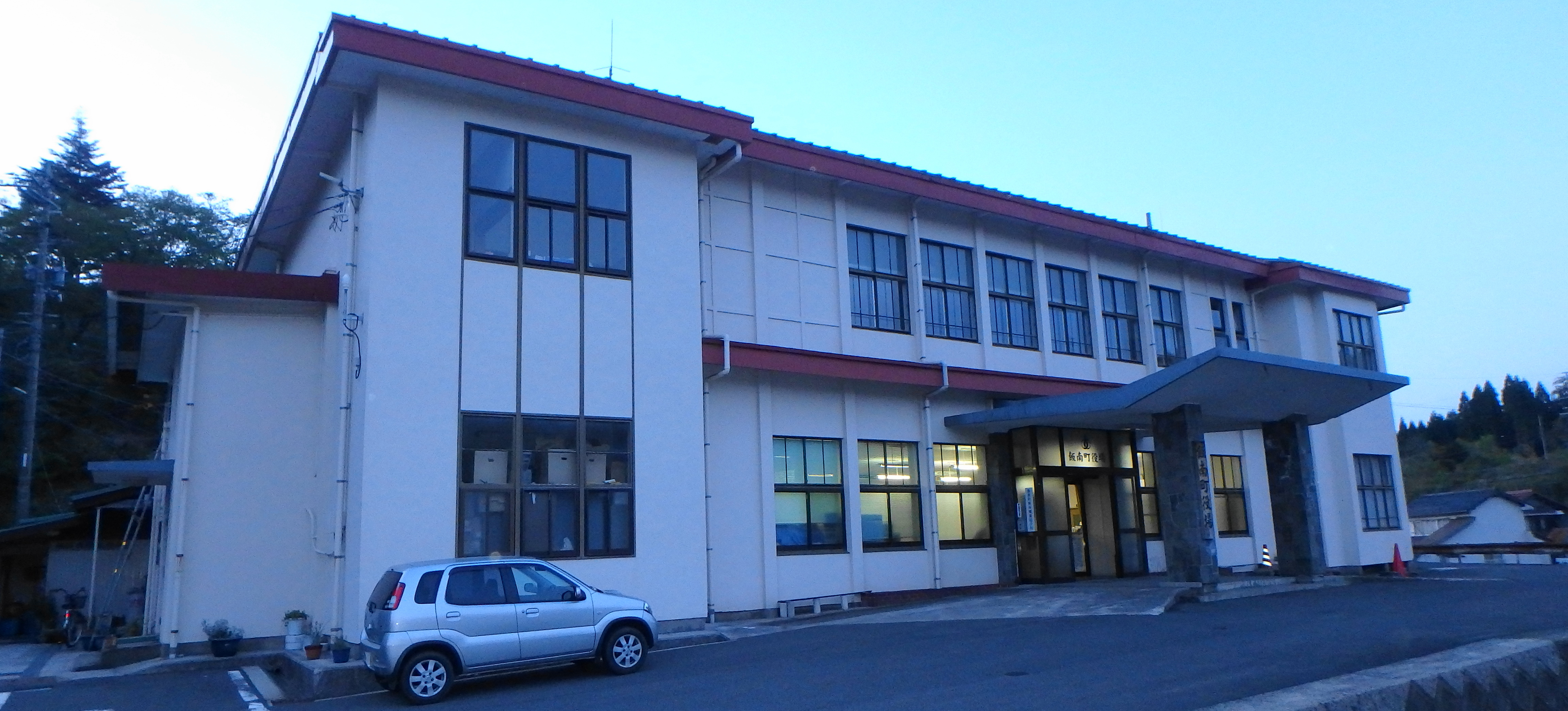
Iinan town hall

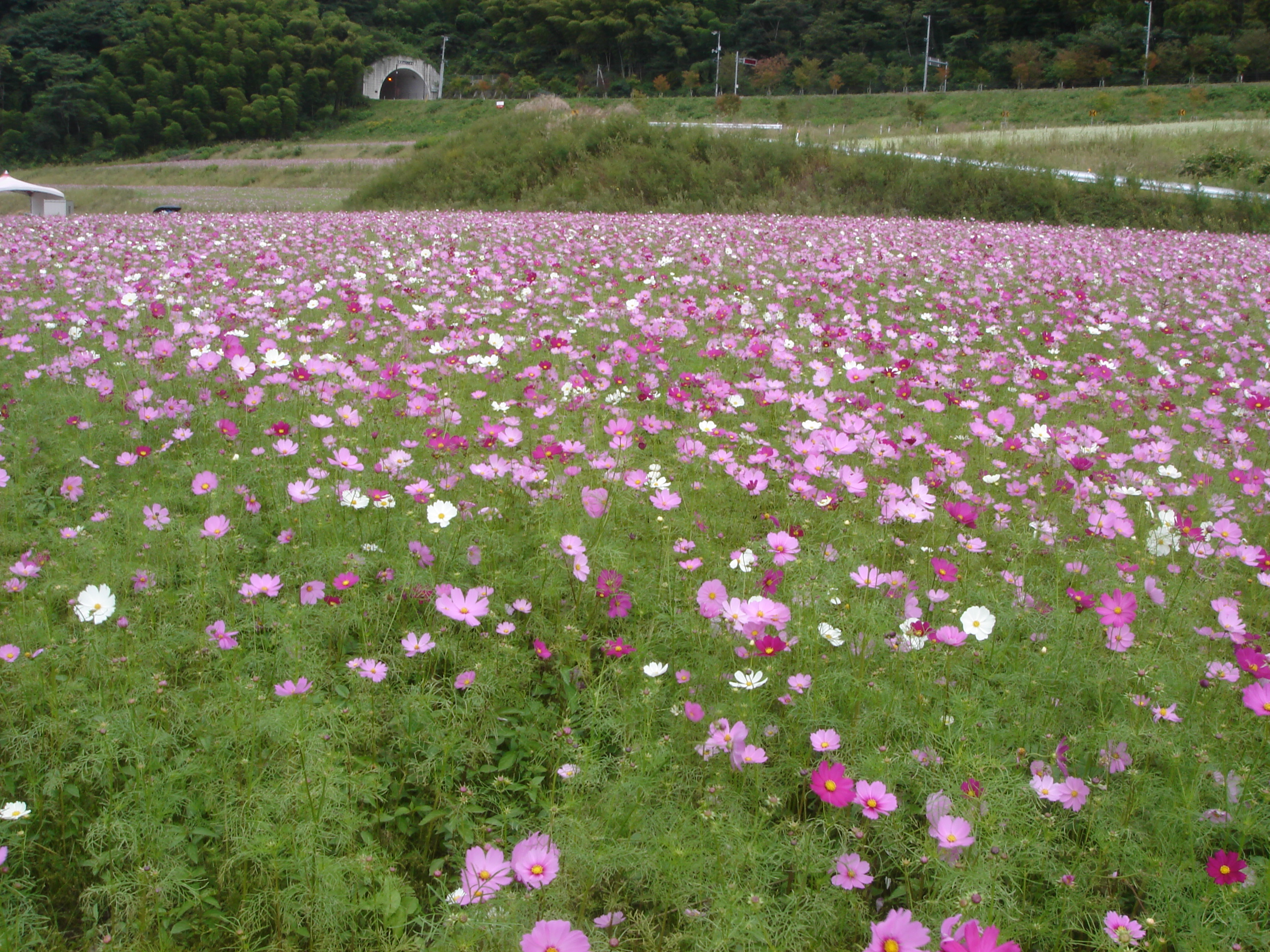
Cosmos flowers along Japan National Route 184

Iinan (飯南町, Iinan-chō) is a town located in Iishi District, Shimane Prefecture, Japan. As of 1 August 2023, the town had an estimated population of 4,502 in 2018 households and a population density of 19 persons per km^{2}. The total area of the town is 242.88 square kilometres (93.78 sq mi).

== Geography ==
Iinan is located in the Chugoku Mountains on the border of Shimane Prefecture and Hiroshima Prefecture, about 90% of the town is forest and wilderness. Surrounded by mountains of around 1000 meters, the flatland is about 450 meters above sea level, and the entire town is a heavy snowfall area. The Gōno River flows to its west. Parts of the town are within the borders of the Hiba-Dogo-Taishaku Quasi-National Park.

- Mountains: Mt. Oyorogi, Mt. Kotobiki, Mt. Mengame
- Rivers: Kando River, Tonbara River, Akana River, Ono River (Tributary of Kando River)
- Lakes: Lake Kijima (Kijima Reservoir).

=== Subdivisions ===
- Akana
- Kijima
- Oda
- Tani
- Tonbara, formerly part of Tonbara, Shimane

=== Surrounding municipalities ===
Hiroshima Prefecture

- Miyoshi

Shimane Prefecture

- Izumo
- Misato
- Ōda
- Unnan

=== Climate ===
Iinan has a humid subtropical climate (Köppen climate classification Cfa) with very warm summers and cool winters. Precipitation is abundant throughout the year. The average annual temperature in Iinan is 11.7 °C (53.1 °F). The average annual rainfall is 2,044.9 mm (80.51 in) with July as the wettest month. The temperatures are highest on average in August, at around 23.8 °C (74.8 °F), and lowest in January, at around 0.3 °C (32.5 °F). The highest temperature ever recorded in Iinan was 35.1 °C (95.2 °F) on 16 July 2018; the coldest temperature ever recorded was −14.0 °C (6.8 °F) on 28 February 1981.

Climate data for Akana, Iinan (1991−2020 normals, extremes 1978−present)
Month	Jan	Feb	Mar	Apr	May	Jun	Jul	Aug	Sep	Oct	Nov	Dec	Year
Record high °C (°F)	14.3 (57.7)	18.6 (65.5)	21.5 (70.7)	28.9 (84.0)	30.6 (87.1)	34.5 (94.1)	35.1 (95.2)	35.0 (95.0)	33.2 (91.8)	28.3 (82.9)	22.8 (73.0)	17.3 (63.1)	35.1 (95.2)
Mean daily maximum °C (°F)	3.8 (38.8)	5.1 (41.2)	10.0 (50.0)	16.6 (61.9)	21.7 (71.1)	24.6 (76.3)	27.8 (82.0)	29.2 (84.6)	24.8 (76.6)	19.1 (66.4)	13.0 (55.4)	6.6 (43.9)	16.9 (62.4)
Daily mean °C (°F)	0.3 (32.5)	0.9 (33.6)	4.4 (39.9)	10.2 (50.4)	15.4 (59.7)	19.3 (66.7)	23.0 (73.4)	23.8 (74.8)	19.4 (66.9)	13.3 (55.9)	7.8 (46.0)	2.6 (36.7)	11.7 (53.0)
Mean daily minimum °C (°F)	−3.2 (26.2)	−3.3 (26.1)	−0.8 (30.6)	3.9 (39.0)	9.4 (48.9)	14.7 (58.5)	19.4 (66.9)	19.8 (67.6)	15.1 (59.2)	8.3 (46.9)	3.0 (37.4)	−1.1 (30.0)	7.1 (44.8)
Record low °C (°F)	−11.8 (10.8)	−14.0 (6.8)	−11.0 (12.2)	−5.7 (21.7)	−1.6 (29.1)	5.3 (41.5)	6.7 (44.1)	10.9 (51.6)	2.3 (36.1)	−1.5 (29.3)	−4.2 (24.4)	−11.0 (12.2)	−14.0 (6.8)
Average precipitation mm (inches)	172.5 (6.79)	144.4 (5.69)	152.6 (6.01)	136.5 (5.37)	155.8 (6.13)	214.5 (8.44)	297.1 (11.70)	172.1 (6.78)	205.3 (8.08)	111.9 (4.41)	106.8 (4.20)	175.4 (6.91)	2,044.9 (80.51)
Average snowfall cm (inches)	179 (70)	139 (55)	47 (19)	1 (0.4)	0 (0)	0 (0)	0 (0)	0 (0)	0 (0)	0 (0)	3 (1.2)	87 (34)	457 (180)
Average precipitation days (≥ 1.0 mm)	18.9	15.9	15.0	11.5	10.3	12.7	13.5	10.9	11.3	9.6	11.9	17.7	159.2
Average snowy days (≥ 3 cm)	16.8	13.9	5.5	0.1	0	0	0	0	0	0	0.3	7.3	43.9
Mean monthly sunshine hours	57.7	74.9	133.7	179.5	203.4	145.4	147.8	178.9	134.9	148.9	109.3	67.9	1,576
Source: Japan Meteorological Agency

== Demographics ==
Per Japanese census data, the population of Iinan has decreased by more than half over the past 50 years.

Historical population
Year	Pop.	±%
1970	9,163	—
1975	8,180	−10.7%
1985	7,771	−5.0%
1985	7,650	−1.6%
1990	7,331	−4.2%
1995	6,893	−6.0%
2000	6,541	−5.1%
2005	5,979	−8.6%
2010	5,534	−7.4%
2015	5,031	−9.1%
2020	4,577	−9.0%
(Population of Tonbara and Akagi added together before 2005)

== History ==
The area of Iinan was part of ancient Izumo Province. During the Edo Period, the area divided between Matsue Domain, and its sub-domain, Hirose Domain. After the Meiji restoration, villages were established within Iishi District, Shimane on April 1, 1889, with the creation of the modern municipalities system, including the village of Tonbara. Tonbara was elevated to town status on April 29, 1949. The town of Iinan was formed on January 1, 2005, from the merger of the towns of Tonbara, and Akagi.

== Government ==
Iinan has a mayor-council form of government with a directly elected mayor and a unicameral town council of ten members. Iinan, collectively with the towns of Unnan, contributes two members to the Shimane Prefectural Assembly. In terms of national politics, the town is part of the Shimane 2nd district of the lower house of the Diet of Japan.

== Economy ==
Iinan is a very rural area, with an economy based on agriculture and forestry.

== Education ==
Iinan has four public elementary school and two public junior high schools operated by the town government, and one public high school operated by the Shimane Prefectural Board of Education.

== Transportation ==
=== Railway ===
Iinan does not have any passenger railway service. The nearest train station is Miyoshi Station on the JR West Geibi Line.

=== Highways ===
- National Route 54
- National Route 184

== Local attractions ==
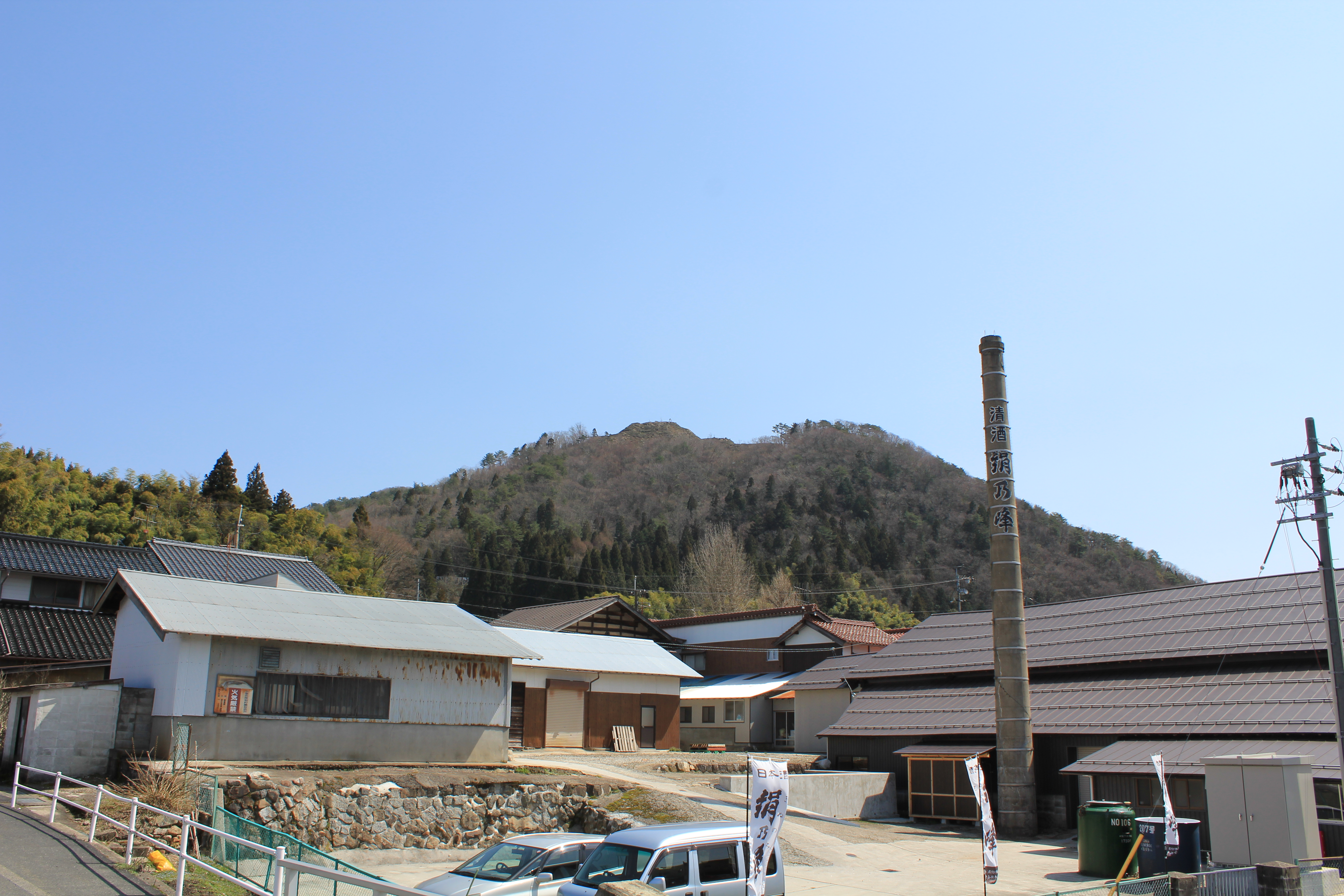
AkanaSetoyamaCastle Distant view

- Akana Castle
  It is an old castle located on top of a hill in the Akana area of the town.
- Akana Marshland
  The Akana Marshland is located in the Fukuda Area of the town, and is centered in Lake Nagao. It is known for having the largest forest of alders in the prefecture.
- Kotobiki Camp Area
  The Kotobiki Camp Area is located at the foot of Mount Kotobiki. It is open from late April to late October.
- Mount Kotobiki
  Mount Kotobiki has an elevation of 1014m. Near the summit of the mountain is a small shrine and a forest of beech trees. The name "Kotobiki" comes from the traditional Japanese musical instrument, the koto.
- Mount Mengame
  Situated on the border of Hiroshima Prefecture and Shimane Prefecture, Mount Mengame has an elevation of 830.3m. It is known for being the only place in the Chūgoku Region in which Luehdorfia are found.
