= Izumo Minari Station =

Railway station in Unnan, Shimane Prefecture, Japan

Izumo Minari Station 出雲三成駅
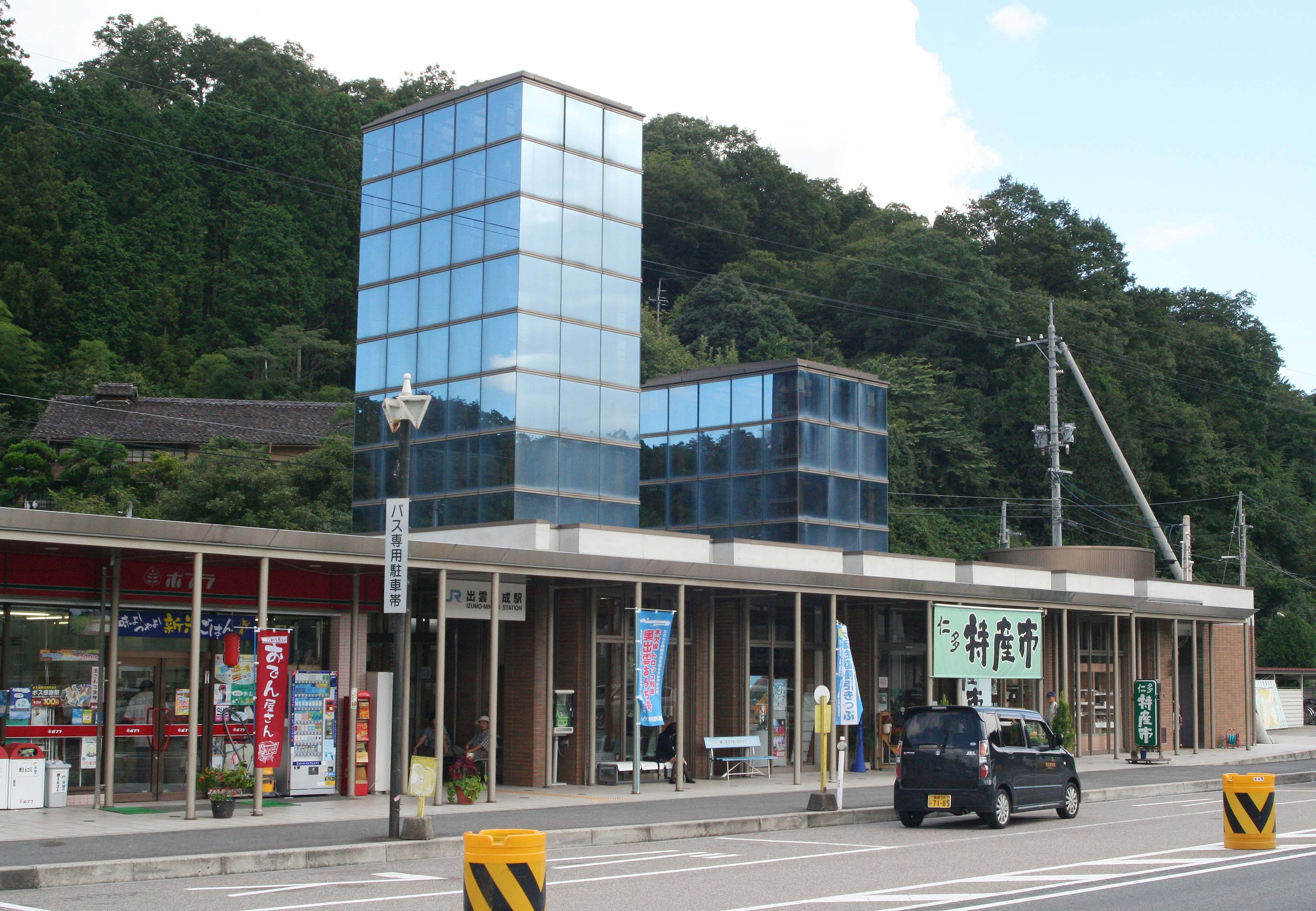
- Izumo Minari Station Station, October 2007

General information
- Location: 641 Minari, Yokuizumo-chō, Nita-gun, Shimane-ken 699-1511; Japan
- Coordinates: 35°11′47.55″N 133°0′35.44″E
- Operator: JR West
- Line: E Kisuki Line
- Distance: 41.5 km (25.8 miles) from Shinji
- Platforms: 2 side platforms
- Tracks: 2

Other information
- Status: Staffed
- Website: Official website

History
- Opened: 18 December 1932

Passengers
- 2020: 2 daily

Services
Preceding station	JR West	Following station
Izumo Yashiro towards Shinji	Kisuki Line	Kamedake towards Bingo Ochiai
Location
- Location within Shimane Prefecture Location within Japan

Izumo Minari Station (出雲三成駅, Izumo Minari-eki) is a passenger railway station located in the town of Okuizumo, Nita District, Shimane Prefecture, Japan. It is operated by the West Japan Railway Company (JR West).

== Lines ==
Izumo Minari Station is served by the Kisuki Line, and is located 41.5 kilometers from the terminus of the line at Shinji.

== Station layout ==
The station consists of two opposed ground-level side platforms connected by a level crossing. The station is staffed and the station building is also used as a store promoting locally-grown crops and local products.

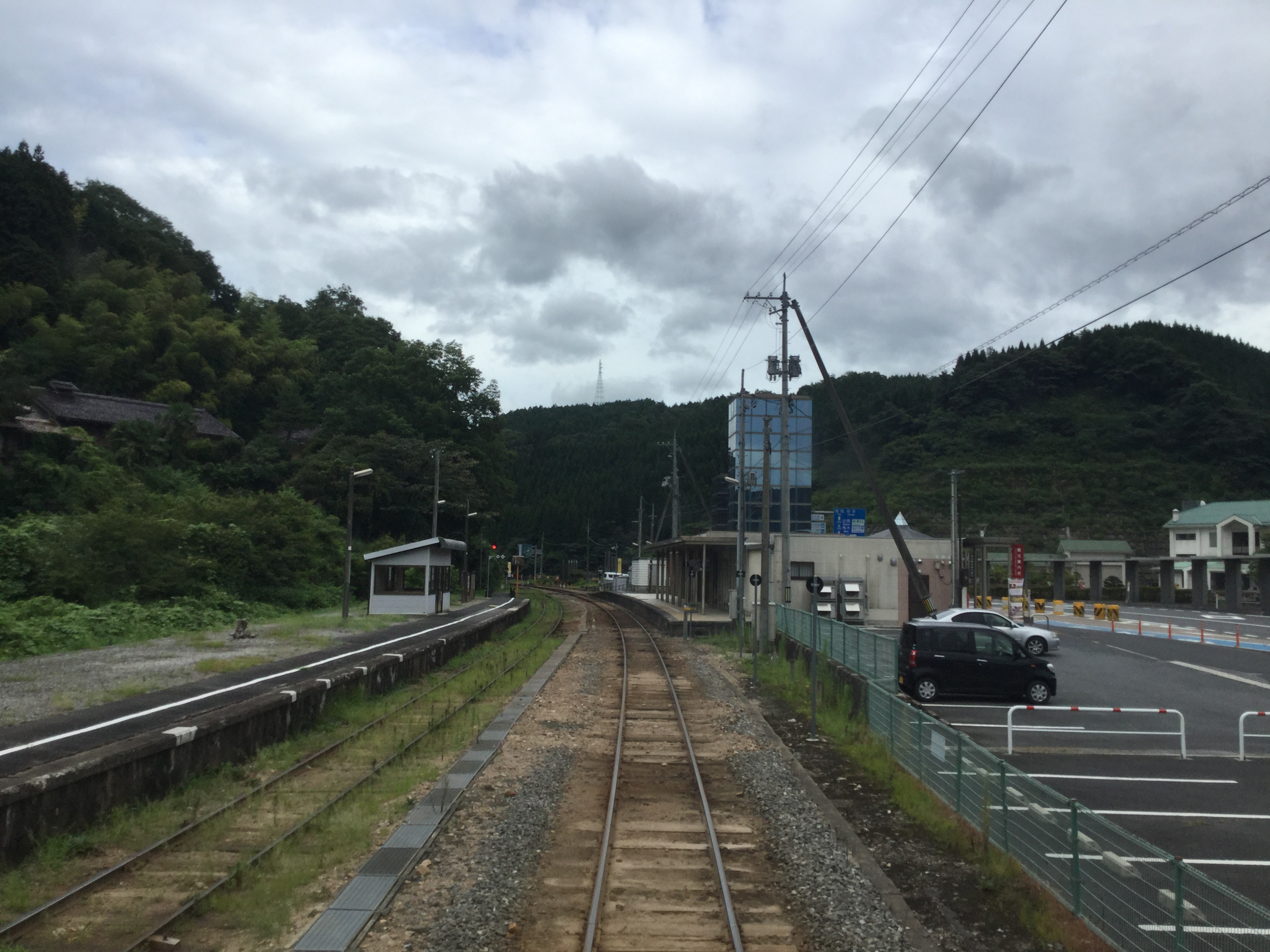
Station platforms, 2019

=== Platforms ===
1	■ E Kisuki Line	for Kisuki and Shinji
2	■ E Kisuki Line	for Izumo Yokota and Bingo-Ochiai

== History ==
Izumo Minari Station was opened on 18 December 1932 when the extension from Kisuki Station on the Kisuki Line was completed. The line was extended through Izumo Minari to Yakawa Station on 20 November 1934. It became part of JR West on 1 April 1987 when Japan National Railways was privatized.

== Passenger statistics ==
In fiscal 2019, the station was used by an average of 43 passengers daily.

== Surrounding area ==
- Okuizumo Town Hall Nita Office Building
- Japan National Route 314

== See also ==
- List of railway stations in Japan
