= Tonbara, Shimane =

Former town in Japan

Tonbara (頓原町, Tonbara-chō) was a town located in Iishi District, Shimane Prefecture, Japan.

As of 2003, the town had an estimated population of 2,968 and 2300.77 persons per km^{2}. The total area was 1.29 km^{2}.

On January 1, 2005, Tonbara, along with the town of Akagi (also from Iishi District), was merged to create the town of Iinan.

== Geography ==
The Kando River (神戸川) runs through Tonbara. Mt. Kotobiki (琴引山) is to the southeast, between Tonbara and Akagi in Iinan.
