= Kamedake Station =

Railway station in Okuizumo, Shimane Prefecture, Japan

Kamedake Station 亀嵩駅
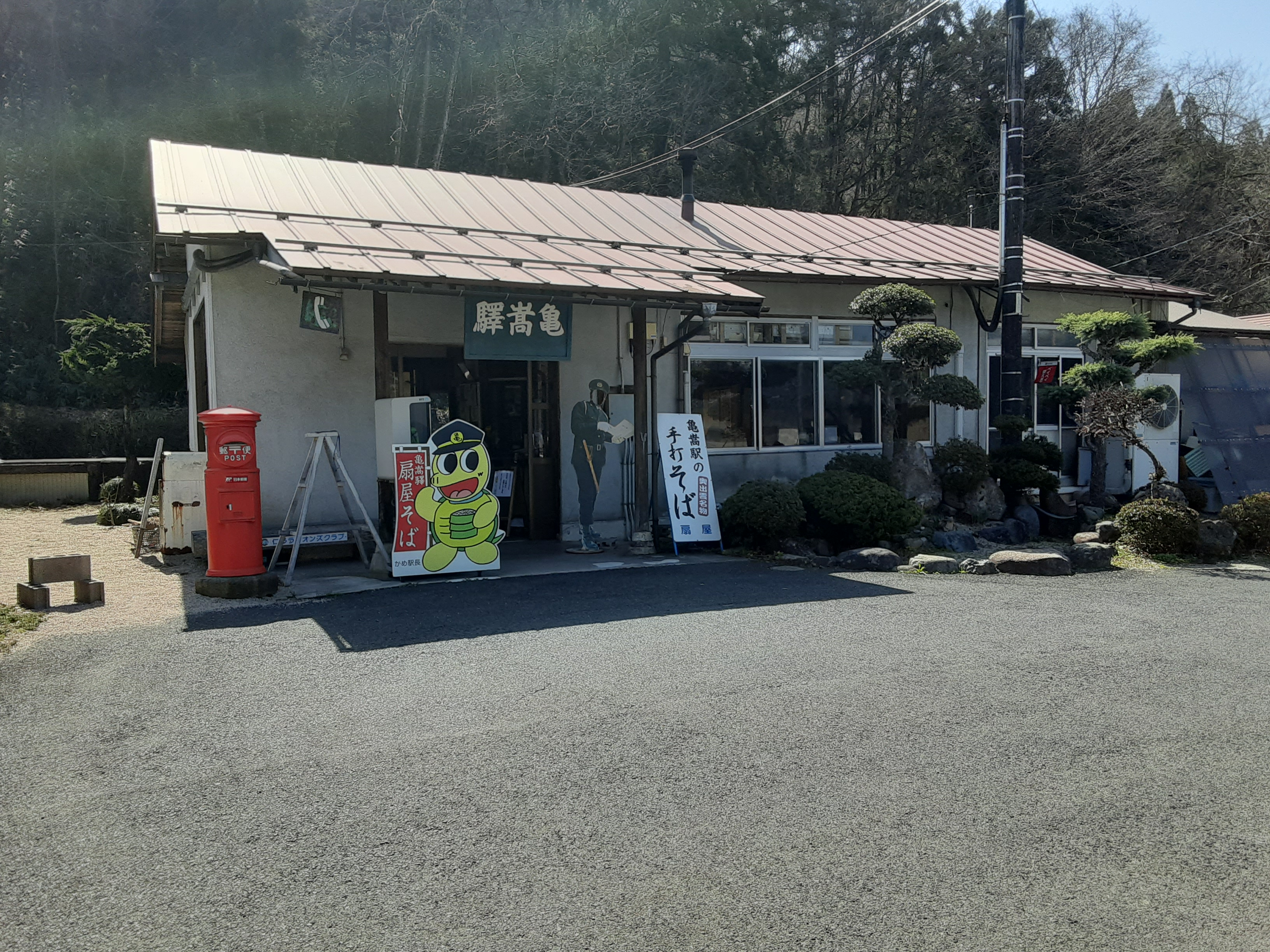
- Kamedake Station, March 2021

General information
- Location: 335, Kōri Mura, Okuizumo-cho, Nita-gun, Shimane-ken 699-1702; Japan
- Coordinates: 35°12′22.71″N 133°3′9.80″E
- Operator: JR West
- Line: E Kisuki Line
- Distance: 45.9 km (28.5 miles) from Shinji
- Platforms: 1 side platform
- Tracks: 1

Other information
- Status: Unstaffed
- Website: Official website

History
- Opened: 20 November 1934

Passengers
- 2020: 20 daily

Services
Preceding station	JR West	Following station
Izumo Minari towards Shinji	Kisuki Line	Izumo Yokota towards Bingo Ochiai
Location
- Location within Shimane Prefecture Location within Japan

Kamedake Station (亀嵩駅, Kamedake-eki) is a passenger railway station located in the town of Okuizumo, Nita District, Shimane Prefecture, Japan. It is operated by the West Japan Railway Company (JR West).

== Lines ==
Kamedake Station is served by the Kisuki Line, and is located 45.9 kilometers from the terminus of the line at Shinji.

== Station layout ==
The station consists of one ground-level side platform serving a single bi-directional track. It used to have two opposed side platforms and two tracks, but the one track and Platform number 2 have been removed. The wooden station building remains, and is used as a soba restaurant, whose owner has been consigned to make ticket sales.

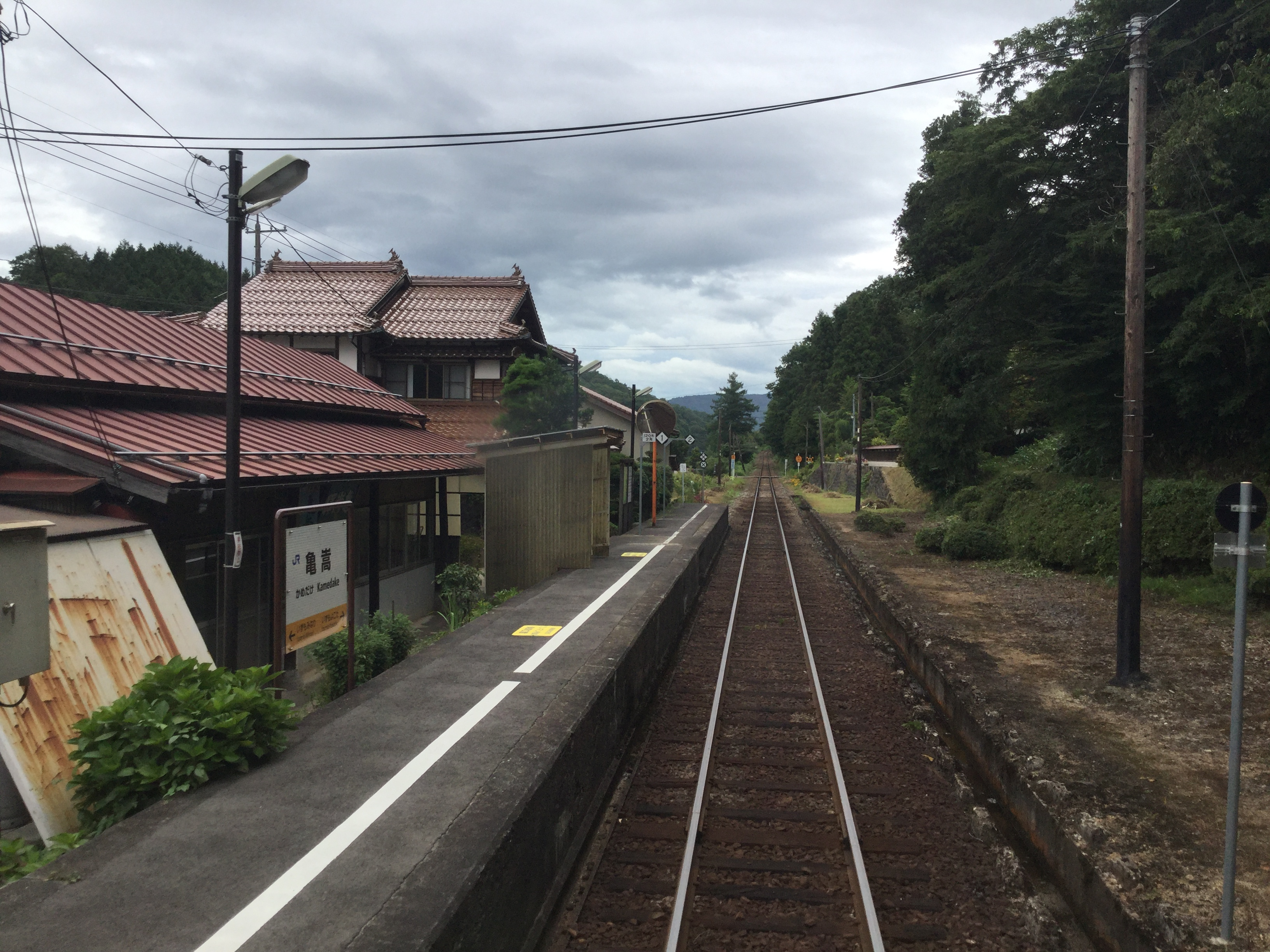
Platform, August 2019 from the train（2019）

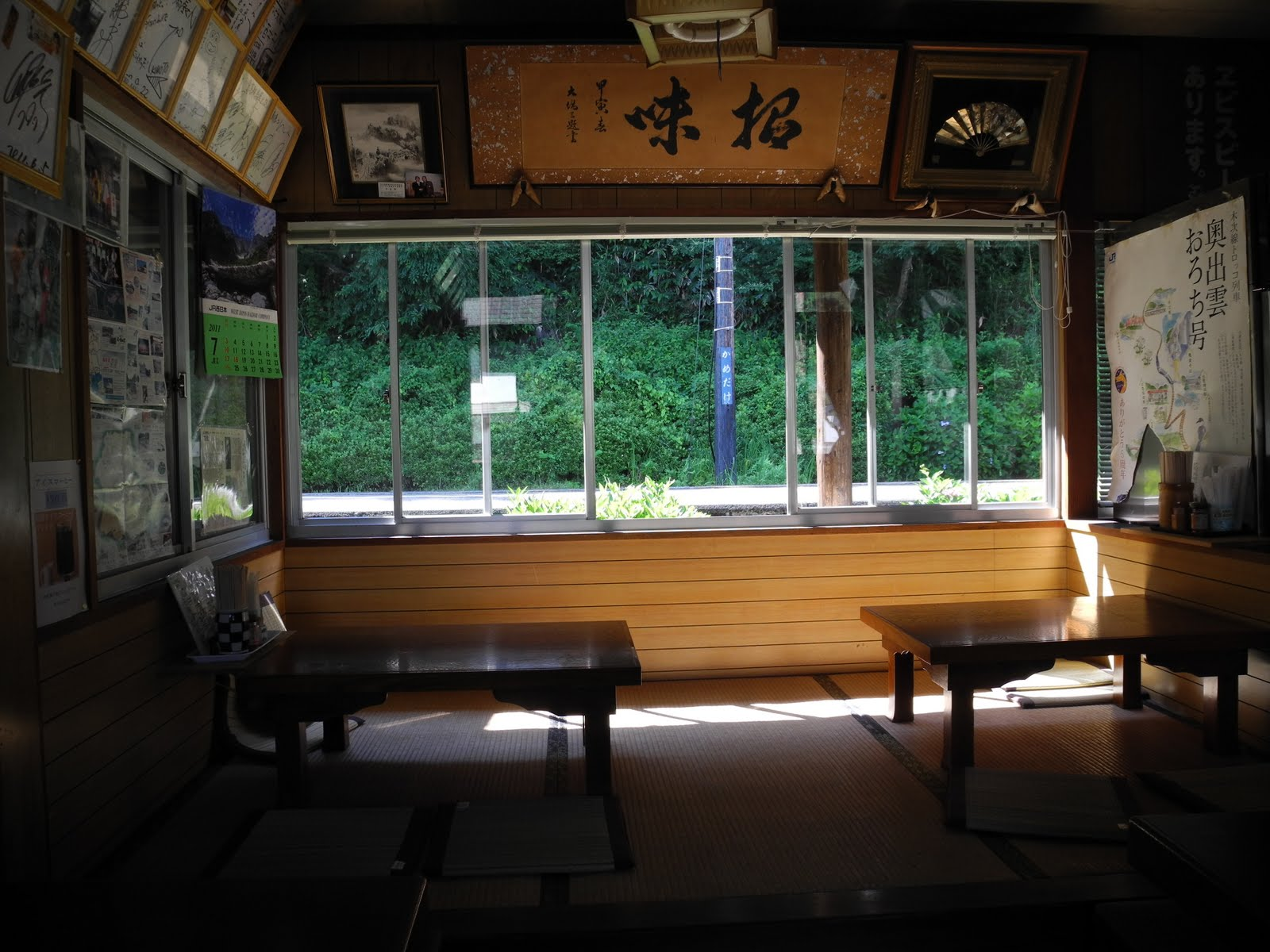
Inside the station building

== History ==
Kamedake Station was opened on 20 November 1934 when the extension between Yakawa Station and Izumo Minari Station on the Kisuki Line was completed. It became part of JR West on 1 April 1987 when Japan National Railways was privatized.

== Passenger statistics ==
In fiscal 2019, the station was used by an average of 20 passengers daily.

== Surrounding area ==
The main urban area of Kamedake hamlet is located about 3 km from the station.

== See also ==
- List of railway stations in Japan
