= Izumo Yokota Station =

Railway station in Okuizumo, Shimane Prefecture, Japan

Izumo Yokota Station 出雲横田駅
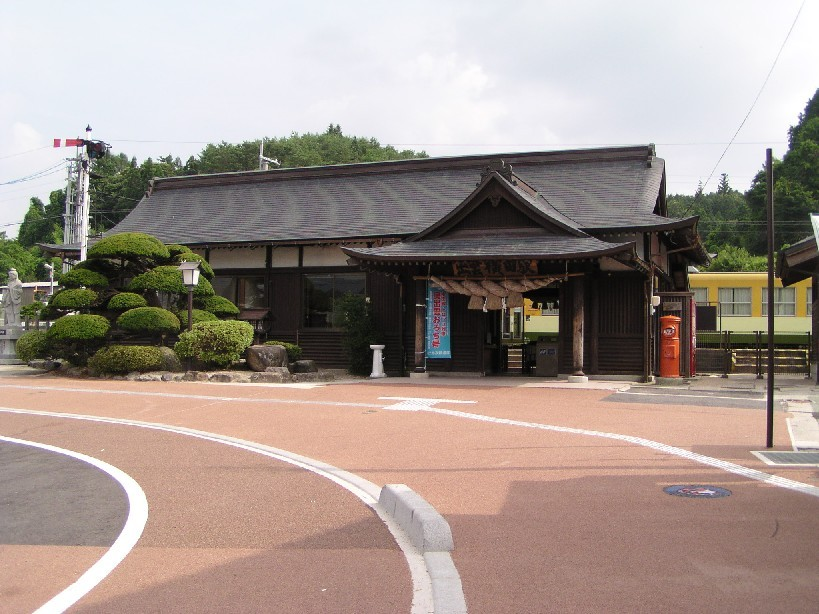
- Izumo Yokota Station

General information
- Location: 1020, Yokota, Okuizumo-cho, Nita-gun, Shimane-ken 699-1832; Japan
- Coordinates: 35°10′38.84″N 133°5′32.86″E
- Operator: JR West
- Line: E Kisuki Line
- Distance: 52.3 km (32.5 miles) from Shinji
- Platforms: 2 sides platform
- Tracks: 2

Other information
- Status: Staffed
- Website: Official website

History
- Opened: 20 November 1934

Passengers
- 2020: 71 daily

Services
Preceding station	JR West	Following station
Kamedake towards Shinji	Kisuki Line	Yakawa towards Bingo Ochiai
Location
- Location within Shimane Prefecture Location within Japan

Izumo Yokota Station (出雲横田駅, Izumo Yokota-eki) is a passenger railway station located in the town of Okuizumo, Nita District, Shimane Prefecture, Japan. It is operated by the West Japan Railway Company (JR West).

== Lines ==
Izumo Yokota Station is served by the Kisuki Line, and is located 52.3 kilometers from the terminus of the line at Shinji. Three trains per day from Shinji continue onward to Bingo Ochiai. From 1998 until 2023, the seasonal Okuizumo-Orochi-Gō (奥出雲おろち号) stopped here on the way to Bingo Ochiai.

== Station layout ==
The station consists of two ground-level side platforms connected by a level crossing. The wooden station building modeled after a Shinto shrine, dates back to when the station opened, and the entrance to the station building is decorated with a shimenawa rope modeled after Izumo-taisha. The station is staffed.

=== Platforms ===
1	■ E Kisuki Line	for Kisuki and Shinji
2	■ E Kisuki Line	for Bingo-Ochiai

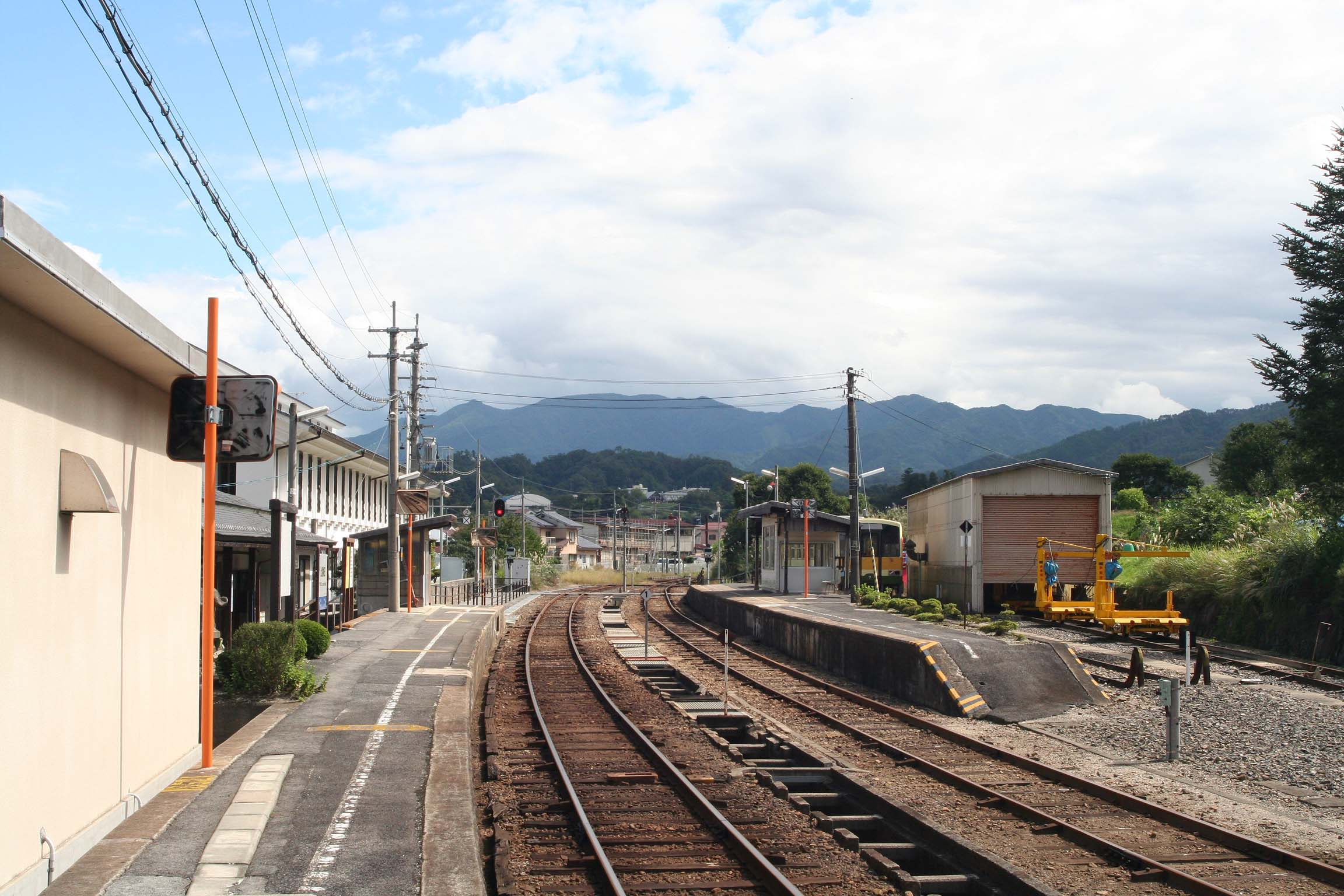
Platforms, October 2007

== History ==
Izumo Yokota Station was opened on 20 November 1934 when the extension between Yakawa Station and Izumo Minari Station on the Kisuki Line was completed. It became part of JR West on 1 April 1987 when Japan National Railways was privatized.

== Passenger statistics ==
In fiscal 2019, the station was used by an average of 71 passengers daily.

== Surrounding area ==
- There is a town square and a semaphore signal in front of the station.
- Unshu Abacus Traditional Industry Ha
- Shimane Prefectural Yokota High School
- Okuizumo Town Yokota Junior High School
- Okuizumo Town Yokota Elementary School
- Okuizumo Town Hall Yokota Office Building (Former Yokota Town Hall)

== See also ==
- List of railway stations in Japan
