= Kisuki, Shimane =

Kisuki, Shimane 木次町
- Town
- Flag Seal
- Interactive map of Kisuki, Shimane
- Country: Japan
- Prefecture: Shimane
- District: Ōhara

Area
  - Total: 64.07 km^{2} (24.74 sq mi)

Population (2003)
  - Total: 9,890
  - Density: 154/km^{2} (400/sq mi)

Kisuki (木次町, Kisuki-chō) was a town located in Ōhara District, Shimane Prefecture, Japan.

As of 2003, the town had an estimated population of 9,890 and a density of 154.36 persons per km^{2}. The total area was 64.07 km^{2}.

On November 1, 2004, Kisuki, along with the towns of Daitō and Kamo (all from Ōhara District), the towns of Kakeya and Mitoya, and the village of Yoshida (all from Iishi District), was merged to create the city of Unnan.

The Kisuki Line is named after the town of Kisuki. The town was known for its sakura tunnel.
