= Mitoya, Shimane =

Dissolved municipality in Shimane prefecture, Japan

Mitoya (三刀屋町, Mitoya-chō) was a town located in Iishi District, Shimane Prefecture, Japan.

As of 2003, the town had an estimated population of 8,442 and a density of 102.10 persons per km^{2}. The total area was 82.68 km^{2}.

On November 1, 2004, Mitoya, along with the towns of Daitō, Kamo and Kisuki (all from Ōhara District), the town of Kakeya, and the village of Yoshida (all from Iishi District), was merged to create the city of Unnan.
