= Unnan =

Unnan 雲南市
- City
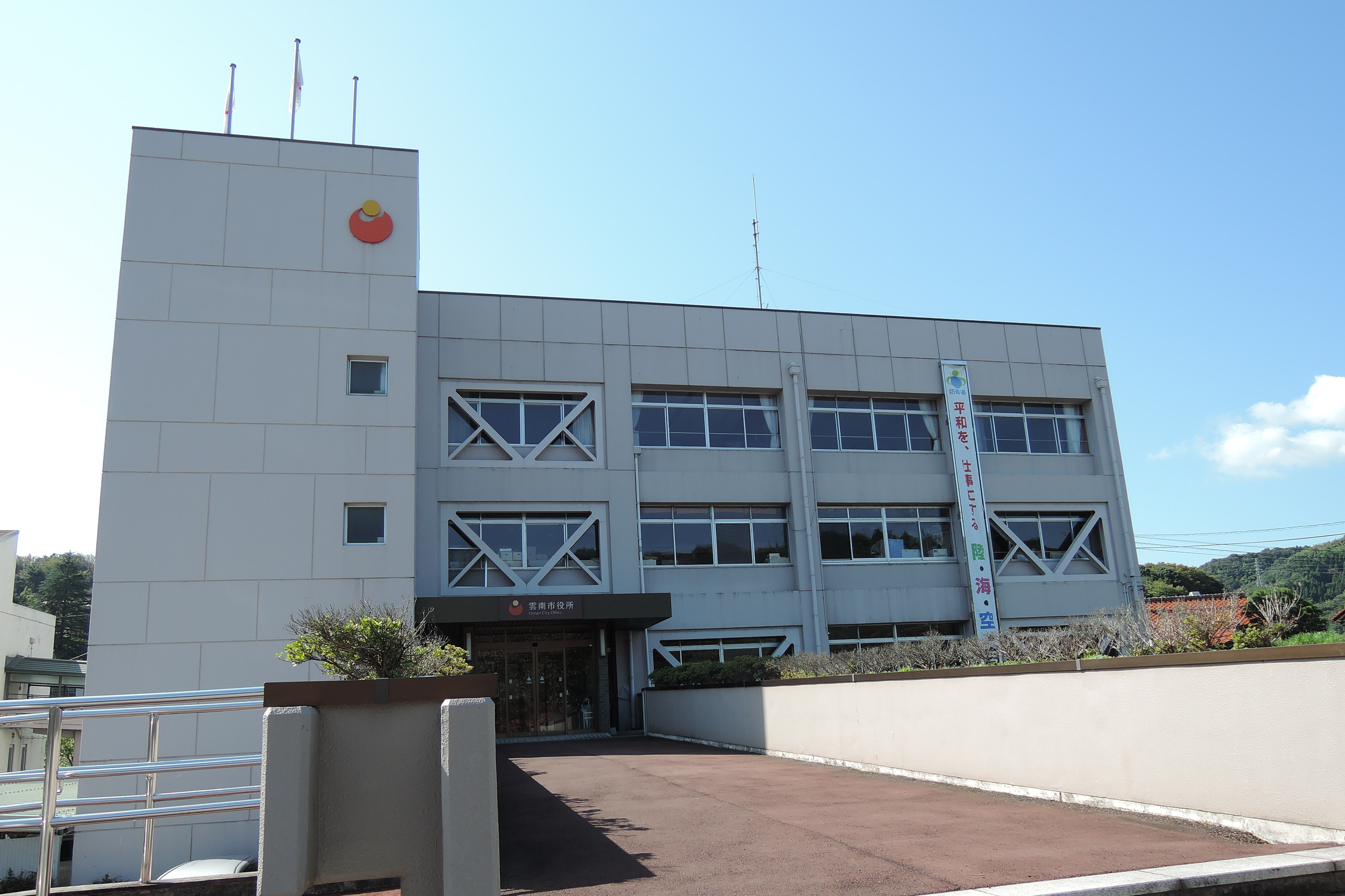
- Unnan city hall

- Flag Emblem
- Location of Unnan in Shimane Prefecture

- Location in Japan
- Coordinates: 35°18′28″N 132°54′01″E
- Country: Japan
- Region: Chūgoku (San'in)
- Prefecture: Shimane
- Kisuki town settled: April 1, 1891
- Kamo town settled: May 1, 1934
- Both town merged and city settled: November 1, 2004

Government
  - Mayor: Atsushi Ishitobi (from January 2021)

Area
  - Total: 553.18 km^{2} (213.58 sq mi)

Population (July 31, 2023)
  - Total: 35,279
  - Density: 63.775/km^{2} (165.18/sq mi)
- Time zone: UTC+09:00 (JST)
- City hall address: 521-1 Satokata, Kisuki-cho, Unnan-shi, Shimane-ken 699-1392
- Climate: Cfa
- Website: Official website
- Symbols
- Flower: Sakura
- Tree: Ginkgo biloba

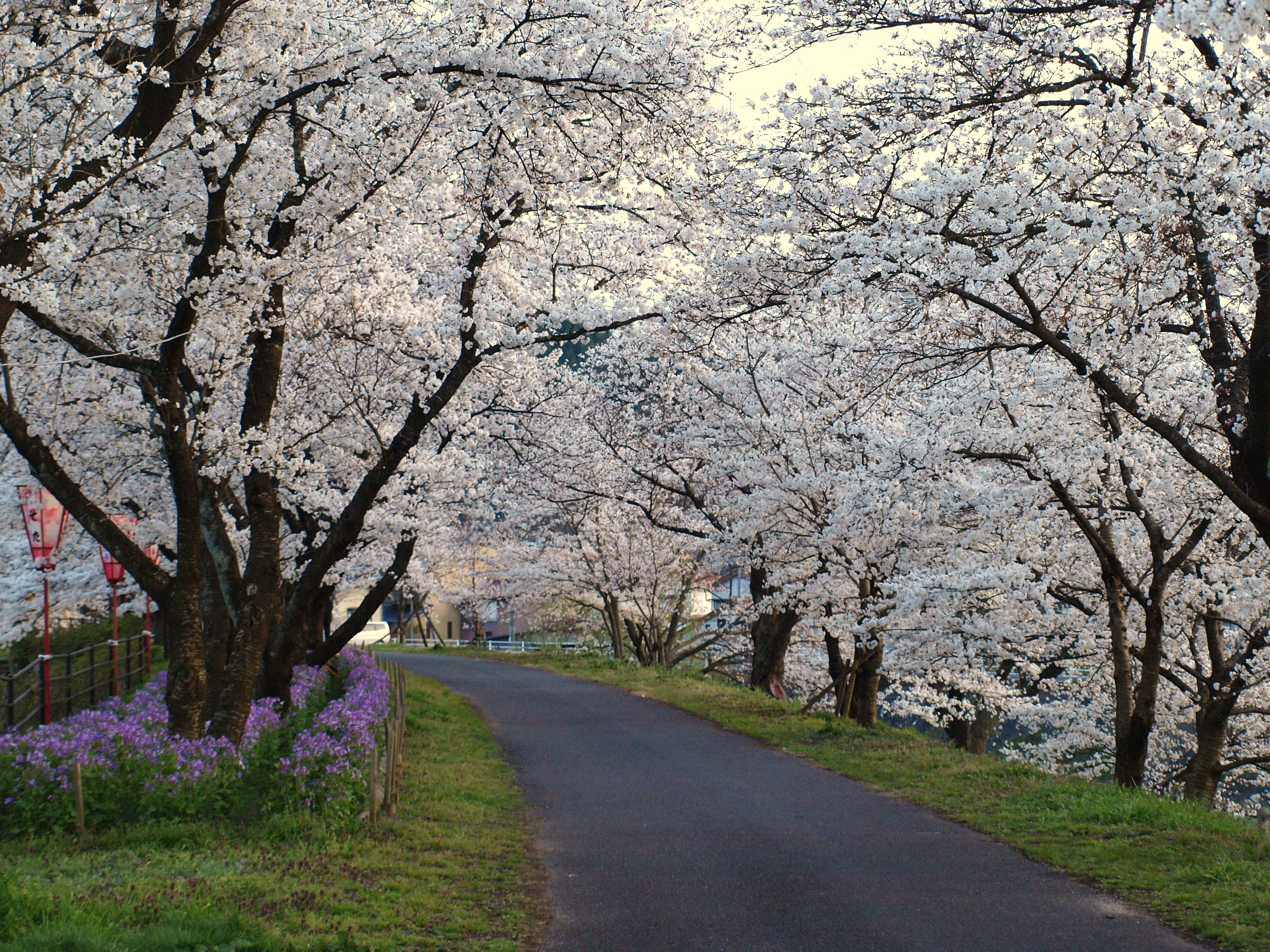
Hii River Embankment

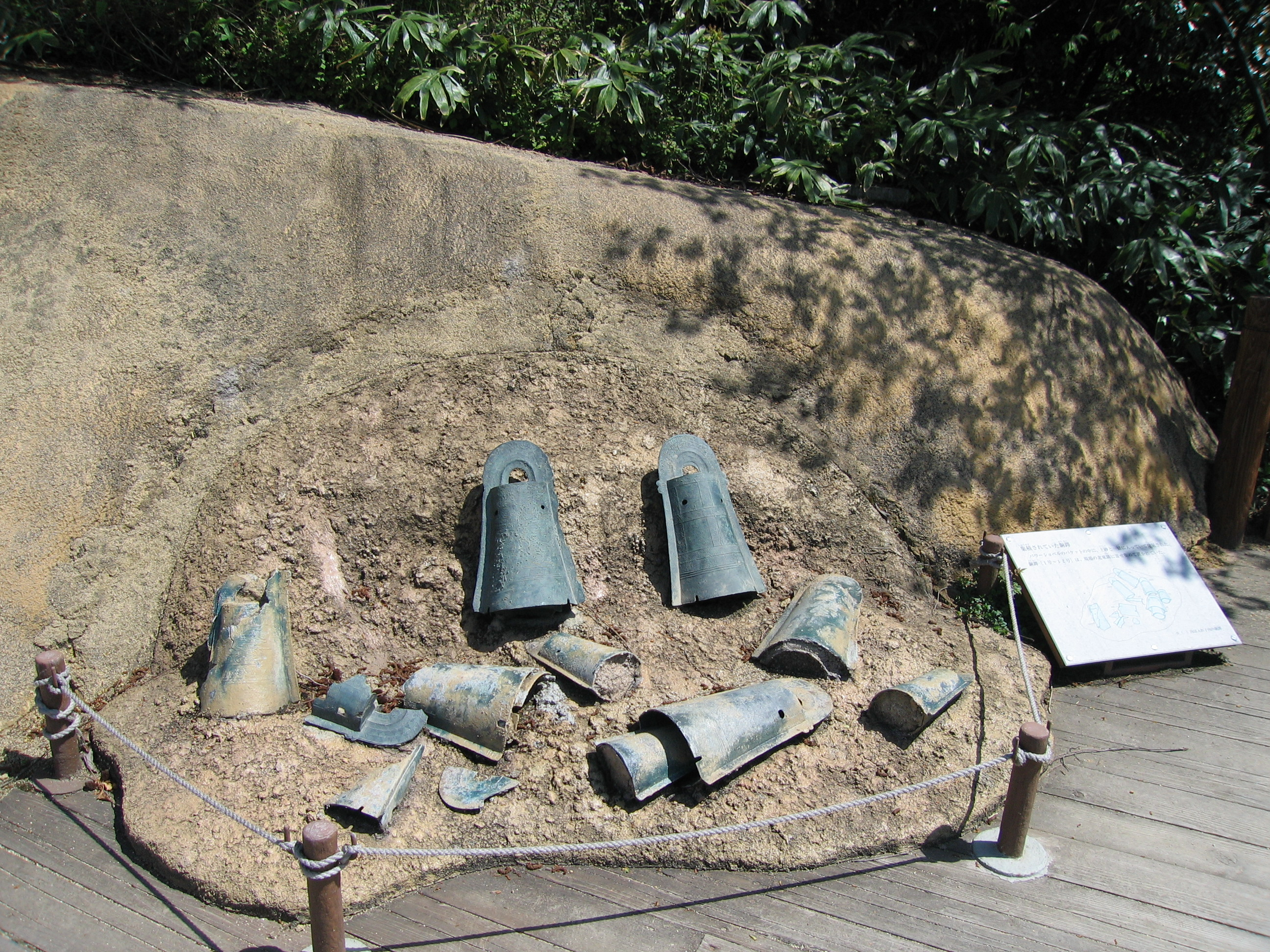
Kamoiwakura Site

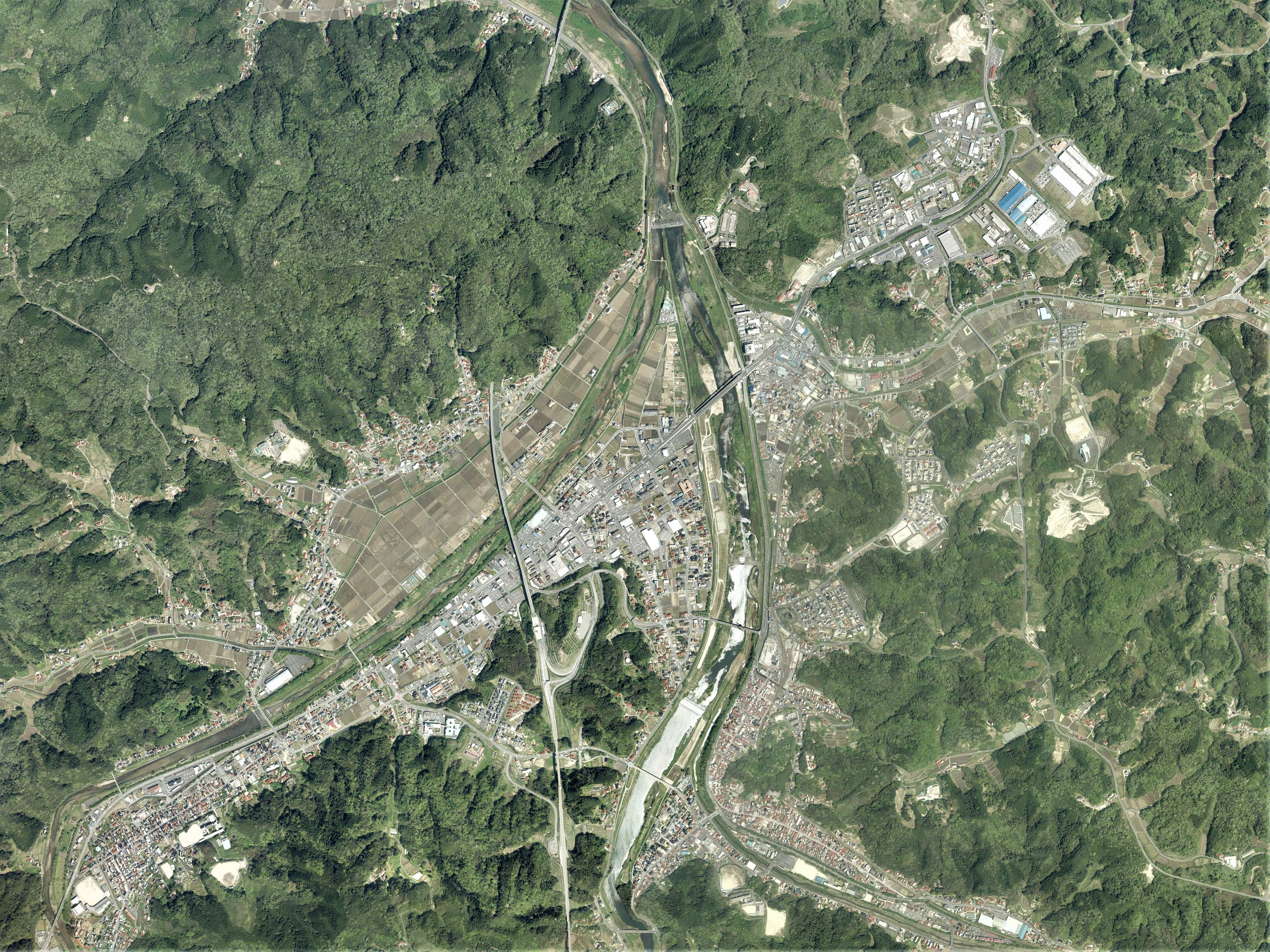
Unnan city center

Unnan (雲南市, Unnan-shi; Japanese pronunciation: [ɯ̈̀ń.nä́ɴ́, -nä́ɰ̃̀.ɕì, ɯ̈́ń-] (Note: The Japanese city's name is only pronounced like this. The Japanese name of the Chinese province of Yunnan is variously pronounced [ɯ̈́ǹ.nä̀ɴ̀, ɯ̈̀ń.nä́ɴ́, ɯ̈́ń.nä́ɴ́].)) is a city located in Shimane Prefecture, Japan. As of 31 July 2023, the city had an estimated population of 35,279 in 13575 households and a population density of 64 persons per km^{2}. The total area of the city is 553.18 square kilometres (213.58 sq mi).

== Geography ==
Unnan City is located in southeastern Shimane Prefecturem with the southern areas in the Chugoku Mountains. Most of the city is forest.

=== Neighboring municipalities ===
Shimane Prefecture

- Iinan
- Izumo
- Matsue
- Okuizumo

Hiroshima Prefecture

- Shōbara

=== Climate ===
Unnan has a humid subtropical climate (Köppen climate classification Cfa) with very warm summers and cool winters. Precipitation is abundant throughout the year. The average annual temperature in Unnan is 13.4 °C (56.1 °F). The average annual rainfall is 1,952.6 mm (76.87 in) with July as the wettest month. The temperatures are highest on average in August, at around 25.3 °C (77.5 °F), and lowest in February, at around 2.4 °C (36.3 °F). The highest temperature ever recorded in Unnan was 37.2 °C (99.0 °F) on 6 August 2021; the coldest temperature ever recorded was −9.7 °C (14.5 °F) on 26 February 1981.

Climate data for Kakeya, Unnan (1991−2020 normals, extremes 1978−present)
Month	Jan	Feb	Mar	Apr	May	Jun	Jul	Aug	Sep	Oct	Nov	Dec	Year
Record high °C (°F)	17.5 (63.5)	22.2 (72.0)	25.0 (77.0)	31.0 (87.8)	33.1 (91.6)	34.9 (94.8)	37.1 (98.8)	37.2 (99.0)	35.6 (96.1)	31.6 (88.9)	25.4 (77.7)	21.3 (70.3)	37.2 (99.0)
Mean daily maximum °C (°F)	6.3 (43.3)	7.6 (45.7)	11.9 (53.4)	18.2 (64.8)	23.3 (73.9)	26.2 (79.2)	29.6 (85.3)	30.8 (87.4)	26.1 (79.0)	20.7 (69.3)	15.2 (59.4)	9.1 (48.4)	18.7 (65.8)
Daily mean °C (°F)	2.4 (36.3)	3.0 (37.4)	6.3 (43.3)	11.8 (53.2)	16.9 (62.4)	20.6 (69.1)	24.7 (76.5)	25.3 (77.5)	20.8 (69.4)	14.9 (58.8)	9.7 (49.5)	4.8 (40.6)	13.4 (56.2)
Mean daily minimum °C (°F)	−0.8 (30.6)	−1.0 (30.2)	1.1 (34.0)	5.5 (41.9)	10.7 (51.3)	15.7 (60.3)	20.8 (69.4)	21.1 (70.0)	16.6 (61.9)	10.1 (50.2)	5.0 (41.0)	1.1 (34.0)	8.8 (47.9)
Record low °C (°F)	−8.0 (17.6)	−9.7 (14.5)	−6.4 (20.5)	−3.8 (25.2)	−0.1 (31.8)	4.9 (40.8)	8.2 (46.8)	13.1 (55.6)	4.0 (39.2)	0.6 (33.1)	−2.0 (28.4)	−6.5 (20.3)	−9.7 (14.5)
Average precipitation mm (inches)	167.0 (6.57)	139.2 (5.48)	155.6 (6.13)	123.2 (4.85)	126.9 (5.00)	186.5 (7.34)	236.0 (9.29)	157.0 (6.18)	234.8 (9.24)	131.2 (5.17)	124.6 (4.91)	170.8 (6.72)	1,952.6 (76.87)
Average precipitation days (≥ 1.0 mm)	19.2	15.9	15.1	11.4	9.9	11.9	12.9	11.2	12.0	10.5	12.6	18.5	161.1
Mean monthly sunshine hours	58.0	79.5	136.8	185.0	210.6	153.1	165.9	189.9	137.5	144.7	109.0	65.9	1,635.2
Source: Japan Meteorological Agency

=== Demographics ===
Per Japanese census data, the population of Unnan in 2020 is 36,007 people.

Historical population
Year	Pop.	±%
1995	48,248	—
2000	46,323	−4.0%
2005	44,403	−4.1%
2010	41,917	−5.6%
2015	39,032	−6.9%
2020	36,007	−7.8%
Unnan population statistics

== History ==
The area of Unnan was part of ancient Izumo Province. During the Edo Period, the area was controlled by Matsue Domain. After the Meiji restoration, the area was divided between the Ohara District, Shimane and Iishi District, Shimane, and further divided into villages on April 1, 1889 with the creation of the modern municipalities system.

The city of Unnan was established on November 1, 2004, from the merger of the towns of Daitō, Kamo, and Kisuki (all from Ōhara District), the towns of Mitoya and Kakeya, and the village of Yoshida (all from Iishi District).

== Government ==
Unnan has a mayor-council form of government with a directly elected mayor and a unicameral city council of 19 members. Unnan contributes nine members to the Shimane Prefectural Assembly. In terms of national politics, the city is part of the Shimane 1st district of the lower house of the Diet of Japan.

== Economy ==
Unnan is a regional commercial center with a local economy based heavily on agriculture, forestry and light manufacturing.

== Education ==
Unnan has 15 public elementary school and seven public junior high schools operated by the city government, and two public high schools operated by the Shimane Prefectural Board of Education.

== Transportation ==
=== Railway ===
JR West (JR West) - Kisuki Line

- Kamonaka - Hataya - Izumo Daitō - Minami Daitō - Kisuki - Hinobori - Shimokuno

=== Highways ===
- Matsue Expressway
- National Route 54
- National Route 314

== Sister cities ==
- Richmond, Indiana, United States

== Local attractions ==
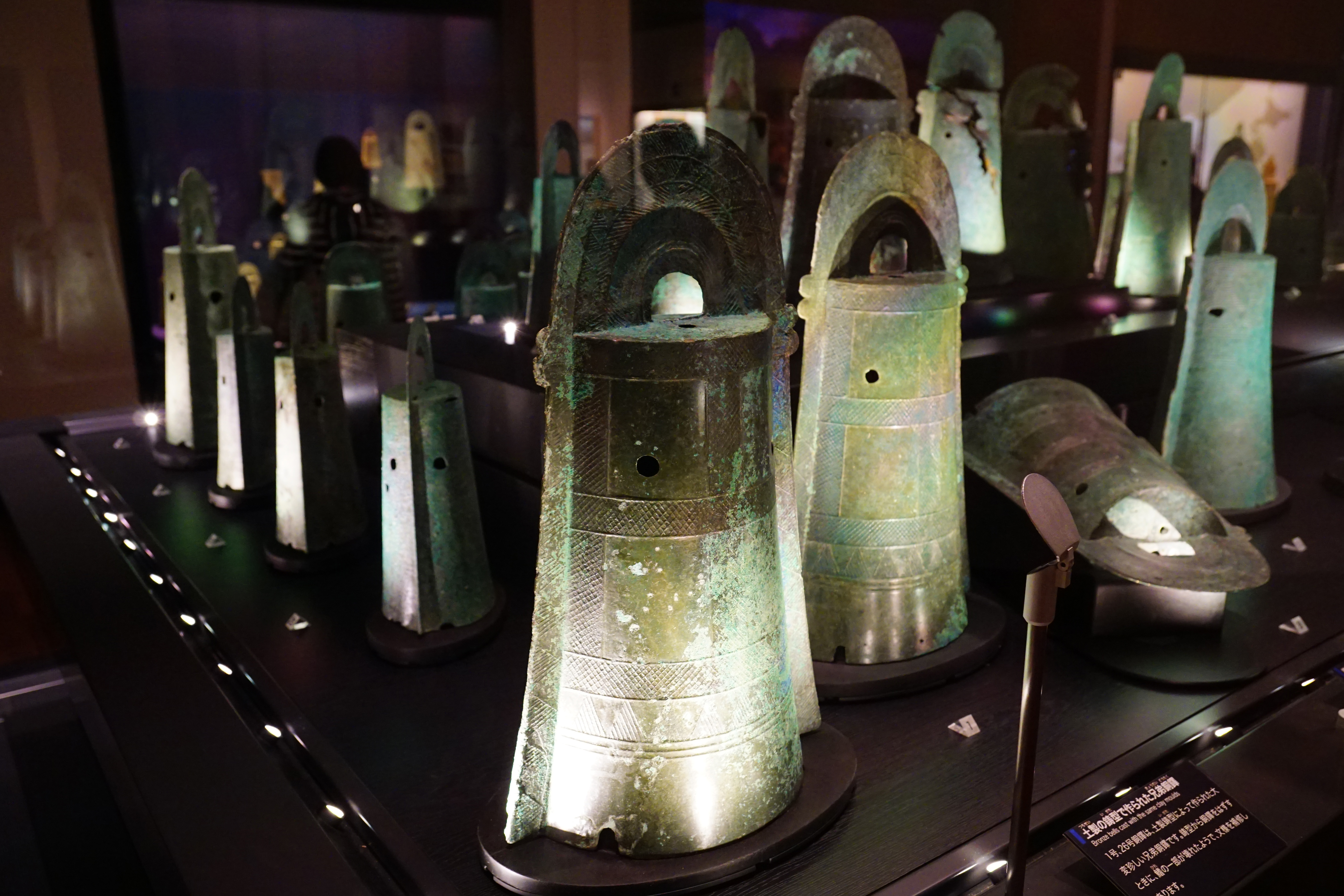
Dōtaku on display in Kamo Iwakura Ruin

- Akagawahotaru Park,
- Hikawabijin Hot Spring
- Historical Museum of Iron
- Kamoiwakura site, National Historic Site
- Kisuki Health Forest
- Lake Shinji
- Matsue Shinji Furusato Forest Park
- Ohara Dam
- Okuizumotane Natural Museum
- Okuizumoyumura Hot Springs
- Sajiroonsen Choja Hot Spring
- Shimaneken Akashimidorigaoka Park
- Suga Shrine
- Ushio Hot Springs
