= Yoshida, Shimane =

Dissolved municipality in Shimane prefecture, Japan

Yoshida (吉田村, Yoshida-mura) was a village located in Iishi District, Shimane Prefecture, Japan.

As of 2003, the village had an estimated population of 2,299 and a density of 20.17 persons per km^{2}. The total area was 113.98 km^{2}.

On November 1, 2004, Yoshida, along with the towns of Daitō, Kamo and Kisuki (all from Ōhara District), and the towns of Kakeya and Mitoya (all from Iishi District), was merged to create the city of Unnan.
