= San-in Chūō Television Broadcasting =

JOMI-DTV
- Logo used since 2020

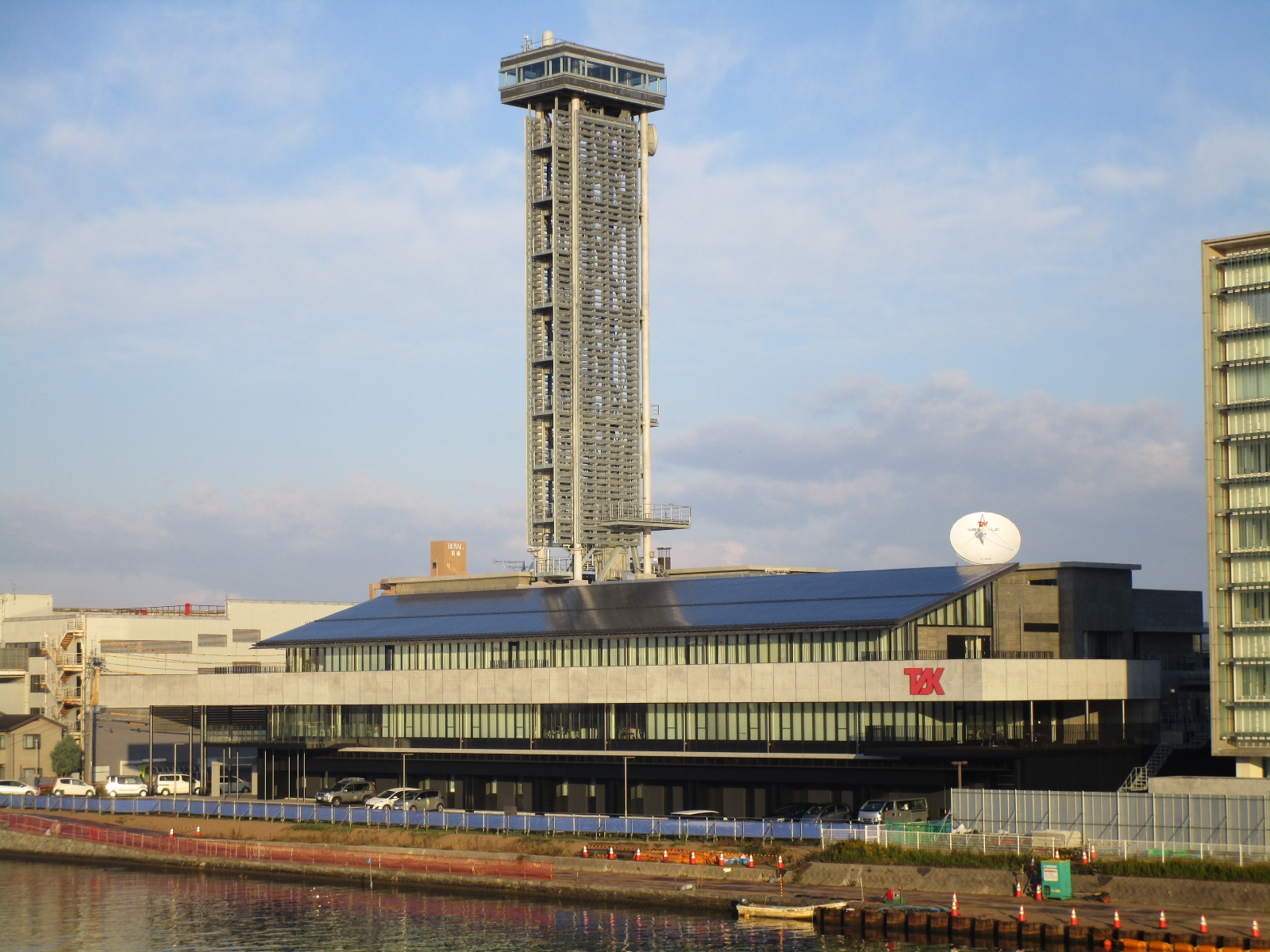
- Headquarters in Mukojimachi, Matsue
- Shimane and Tottori; Japan
- City: Matsue
- Channels: Digital: 43 (UHF); Virtual: 8
- Branding: San-in Chūō Television; TSK

Programming
- Affiliations: Fuji News Network and Fuji Network System

Ownership
- Owner: San-in Chuo Television Broadcasting Co., Ltd.

History
- Founded: January 17, 1969
- First air date: April 1, 1970
- Former call signs: JOMI-TV (1970–2011)
- Former names: Television Shimane (1970–1972)
- Former channel numbers: Analog: 34 (UHF, 1970–2011)
- Call sign meaning: Reversed letters M and I from prefecture's name (ShIMane)

Technical information
- Licensing authority: MIC

Links
- Website: www.tsk-tv.com

JOMI-DTV (channel 8), branded as San-in Chūō Television (さんいん中央テレビ, San-in Chūō Terebi; TSK) is a Japanese television station serving as the affiliate of the Fuji News Network and Fuji Network System for the Shimane and Tottori prefectures. Owned-and-operated by San-in Chūō Television Broadcasting Co., Ltd. (山陰中央テレビジョン放送株式会社, San-in Chūō Terebijon Hōsō Kabushiki-gaisha) formerly known as Shimane Broadcasting Co., Ltd. (島根放送株式会社, Shimane Hōsō Kabushiki-gaisha) from 1970 to 1972, its headquarters and studios are located in Mukojimachi, Matsue, Shimane prefecture.
