= Kakeya, Shimane =

Dissolved municipality in Iishi district, Shimane prefecture, Japan

Kakeya (掛合町, Kakeya-machi) was a town located in Iishi District, Shimane Prefecture, Japan.

As of 2003, the town had an estimated population of 3,783 and a density of 34.55 per km^{2}. The total area was 109.50 km^{2} (42.28 sq mi)

On November 1, 2004, Kakeya, along with the towns of Daito, Kamo and Kisuki (all from Ōhara District), the town of Mitoya, and the village of Yoshida (all from Iishi District), was merged to create the city of Unnan.

== Notable residents ==
- Prime Minister Noboru Takeshita (1924-2000)
