= Tanabe Art Museum =

Coordinates: 35°28′45″N 133°2′59.3″E

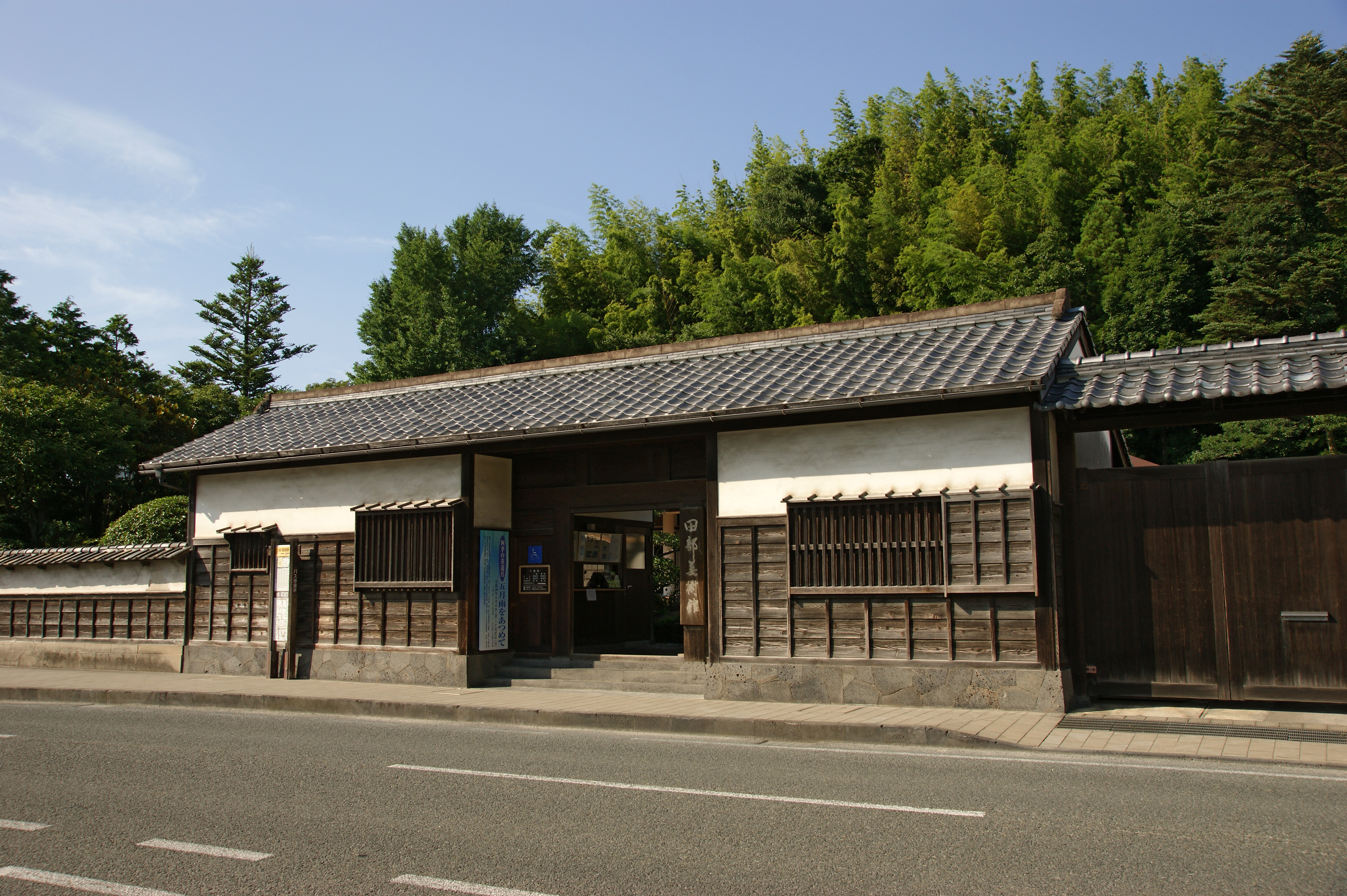
Tanabe Art Museum in Matsue

The Tanabe Art Museum (田部美術館, Tanabe Bijutsukan) was established in Matsue, Shimane Prefecture, Japan in 1979. Designed by Kiyonori Kikutake and with a total floor area of 854 sqm, it houses a collection of tea ceremony implements and other treasures acquired by the local Tanabe clan.

== See also ==
- Japanese tea ceremony
- Shimane Art Museum
