= List of 20th-century American writers by birth year =

List of 20th-century American writers is an excerpt from a list of 20th century American writers, sorted by birth year.

== 1946 ==
Name	Birthplace	Genre/Movement/Subject(s)
Tim O'Brien	Austin, Minnesota	Vietnam War

== 1950 ==
Name	Birthplace	Genre/Movement
James Blaylock	Long Beach, California	Science fiction, humorous style, steampunk
K.W. Jeter		science fiction and horror
Stephen R. Lawhead	Kearney, Nebraska	fantasy, science fiction, and historical fiction

== 1952 ==
Name	Birthplace	Genre/Movement
Kim Stanley Robinson	Waukegan, Illinois	Science fiction, ecological, cultural and political themes
Amy Tan	Oakland, California	Asian American literature

== 1951 ==
Name	Birthplace	Genre/Movement
Rilla Askew		
Greg Bear	San Diego, California	Science fiction

== 1952 ==
Name	Birthplace	Genre/Movement
Tim Powers	Buffalo, New York	Science fiction and fantasy
Gary Soto	Fresno, California	Chicano literature

== 1953 ==
Name	Birthplace	Genre/Movement
Pat Cadigan	Fort Meade, Maryland	Science Fiction, Cyberpunk

== 1954 ==
Name	Birthplace	Genre/Movement
Louise Erdrich	Little Falls, Minnesota	Postmodernism, Native American Renaissance
Bruce Sterling	Brownsville, Texas	Cyberpunk, Science fiction
Neal Stephenson	Fort Meade, Maryland	Science fiction, speculative fiction

== 1956 ==
Name	Birthplace	Genre/Movement
Peter David	Fort Meade, Maryland	Comic books
Katie McKy		Education

== 1962 ==
Name	Birthplace	Genre/Movement
Chuck Palahniuk	Pasco, Washington	Postmodernism, minimalism

== 1963 ==
Name	Birthplace	Genre/Movement
Donna Tartt	Greenwood, Mississippi	Neo-romanticism

== See also ==
- List of 20th-century writers
- Literature in the 1970s
