= Katie McKy =

American writer

Katie McKy is an American educator and writer of mainstream material, children's literature, fishing articles for sporting magazines, and professional academic material in the field of education.

McKy was born on August 28, 1956 and received a master's degree in education from Harvard University. McKy worked for over 20 years as a teacher to disadvantaged, learning disabled, and emotionally disturbed students.

McKy's works include Tough Kids/Tough Classrooms, ISBN 1-931680-43-4, It All Began With a Bean ISBN 0-9749303-0-X, and Freudian Feral, Gray's Sporting Journal, May/June 2002.
