= Richard Beale Davis =

American academic (1907–1981)

- Born: June 3, 1907; Accomac, Virginia, U.S.
- Died: March 30, 1981 (aged 73); Knoxville, Tennessee, U.S.
- Resting place: Blandford Cemetery, Petersburg, Virginia, U.S.
- Occupation: Academic
- Awards: National Book Award (1979)

Academic background
- Education: University of Virginia

Academic work
- Institutions: University of Tennessee
- Notable works: Intellectual Life in the Colonial South, 1585–1763 (1978)
- Military career
- Allegiance: United States
- Branch: United States Navy
- Service years: 1943–1946
- Rank: Lieutenant

Richard Beale Davis (June 3, 1907 – March 30, 1981) was an American academic who specialized in the history of the Southern United States, with a focus on its literature and intellectual history. His works include the 1978 book Intellectual Life in the Colonial South, which was awarded the National Book Award for history and several other accolades. He taught at the University of Virginia, University of South Carolina, and University of Tennessee, among other places.

Davis was born in Accomac, Virginia to a family with local religious and academic connections. He began teaching in the 1920s, receiving his master's degree from the University of Virginia in 1933 and his PhD in 1936. He joined the University of South Carolina as an associate professor of English in 1940, taking leave during the Second World War to teach for the United States Navy. Davis returned to South Carolina and then joined the faculty of the University of Tennessee. While there, he was involved with the James D. Hoskins Library and the Phi Beta Kappa honor society. He was made an Alumni Distinguished Service Professor in 1962 and retired from teaching fifteen years later. During this time, he held several fellowships and was a member of the American Antiquarian Society.

Davis's most-celebrated work was his 1978 book Intellectual Life in the Colonial South, 1585–1763, a three-volume study of the history and culture of the American South. According to Jack P. Greene, it was the "single most comprehensive description ever undertaken of the cultural life of any segment of Britain's early modern American empire". Davis's reputation as a scholar was solidified through his extensive body of work, with Leo Lemay referring to him as "the greatest modern authority on early Southern literature". Similar views were offered by Louis D. Rubin Jr., praising the way he "decisively chartered and explored the colonial southern literary scene".

== Early life and education ==
Richard Beale Davis was born in Accomac, Virginia, on June 3, 1907. His mother was Margaret Josephine (née Wills), and his father was Henry Woodhouse Davis, a Methodist minister across Virginia. He had two sisters, Virginia Holmes and Mary Eleanor. His paternal great-grandfather was Williams Thomas Davis, founding president of the Southern Female College in Petersburg, Virginia. The family's papers are held by the library at the University of Virginia.

Davis received his undergraduate degree from Randolph–Macon College in 1927. His father had graduated from the same college in 1903. In 1933, Davis received a master's degree from the University of Virginia, and in 1936 they awarded him a PhD.

On August 25, 1936, Davis married Lois Camp Bullard at his parents' house in Franklin, Virginia.

== Academic career ==
Following his undergraduate degree, Davis taught at McGuire's University School in Richmond, Virginia until 1930. In a review of a book about the school, Davis spoke briefly of his time teaching there. From 1930 until 1932, he taught at Randolph-Macon Academy. Following his MA, he taught at the University of Virginia until 1936. He then taught for four years at the Fredericksburg Teachers College (known as Mary Washington College from 1938), holding the position of associate professor of English. In 1940, Davis joined the University of South Carolina as an associate professor in the English department.

During the Second World War, he served in the United States Navy Reserve. In 1943, he held the rank of Lieutenant (junior grade). He was executive officer of the V-12 Navy College Training Program at Emory and Henry College. He then served as commanding officer of the Navy Academic Refresher Unit (V-5) at the Northwestern State College of Louisiana. In January 1946, the Naval Station at Northwestern was decommissioned, having trained around 4,000 Navy personnel in three years. Davis was discharged from the Navy at the same time with the rank of Lieutenant. Following the war, he returned to the University of South Carolina, and was promoted to a full professorship in June 1946.

In 1947, he joined the University of Tennessee. In 1962, he was made an Alumni Distinguished Service professor. While there, he was heavily involved with the James D. Hoskins Library, working with the acquisitions department to identify possible purchases. From 1949 until 1971, he served as chairman of the library's Committee on Special Documents. He was also a member of the Faculty Library Committee from 1958 to 1970.

Davis held various other positions during his time at the University of Tennessee, serving a year as a Fulbright professor at the University of Oslo in 1955 and another year as a US State Department lecturer in India in 1957. In 1955, he was awarded a fellowship at the Folger Shakespeare Library and a Doctor of Letters by Randolph-Macon College. In 1946, he received a Guggenheim Fellowship for post-military service scholars. He received a second Guggenheim Fellowship in 1959.

In 1977, Davis retired from teaching. He received a Festschrift upon his retirement, titled Essays in Early Virginia Literature Honoring Richard Beale Davis.

== Group memberships ==
Davis was associated with several historical and literature-focused groups, representing his academic interests and those further afield. In 1955, Davis was elected vice-president of the newly formed branch of the American Studies Association (ASA) for Kentucky and Tennessee. In 1958, he was elected to the executive council of the nationwide ASA. The same year, he served on the Regional Advisory Board for the Old Southwest Region of the Bibliographical Society of America. In 1959, he was elected vice-chairman of the Southern Humanities Conference, and served as its chairman in 1960. In 1968, Davis began serving a two-year term on the executive council of the Society for the Study of Southern Literature. He was elected its first president in the same year.

In 1972, Davis was made an honorary member of the Virginia Historical Society, having contributed to the group's journal for several years. He was elected a member of the American Antiquarian Society the following year, later receiving a certificate from them upon his retirement from teaching. He attended a single meeting of the elite group, in October 1974. In 1975, Davis was a founding member of the Nathaniel Hawthorne Society. He had taught courses on Hawthorne since the 1940s.

In 1965, Davis served as president for the University of Tennessee's new Phi Beta Kappa chapter, Epsilon of Tennessee. He began writing for the society's magazine The Key Reporter in 1967, reviewing books in American culture and history.

=== Modern Language Association ===
In 1952, Davis served as secretary of the American Literature section of the South Atlantic Modern Language Association (SAMLA). The following year, he served as chairman of the section. He served on the executive committee of SAMLA from 1963 until 1967, serving as vice-president in 1964 and president the following year. During 1977, he served on its Fiftieth Anniversary Committee.

Following the creation of the Modern Language Association's Early American Literature Group in the 1960s, Davis was elected to sit on its executive committee. He later served as chairman of its nominating and advisory committee. In 1977, the group named him as an Honored Scholar.

Davis served on the executive committee of the MLA-affiliated Center for Editions of American Authors. He also served on the MLA's standing committee on copyright during the early 1970s.

== Writing career ==
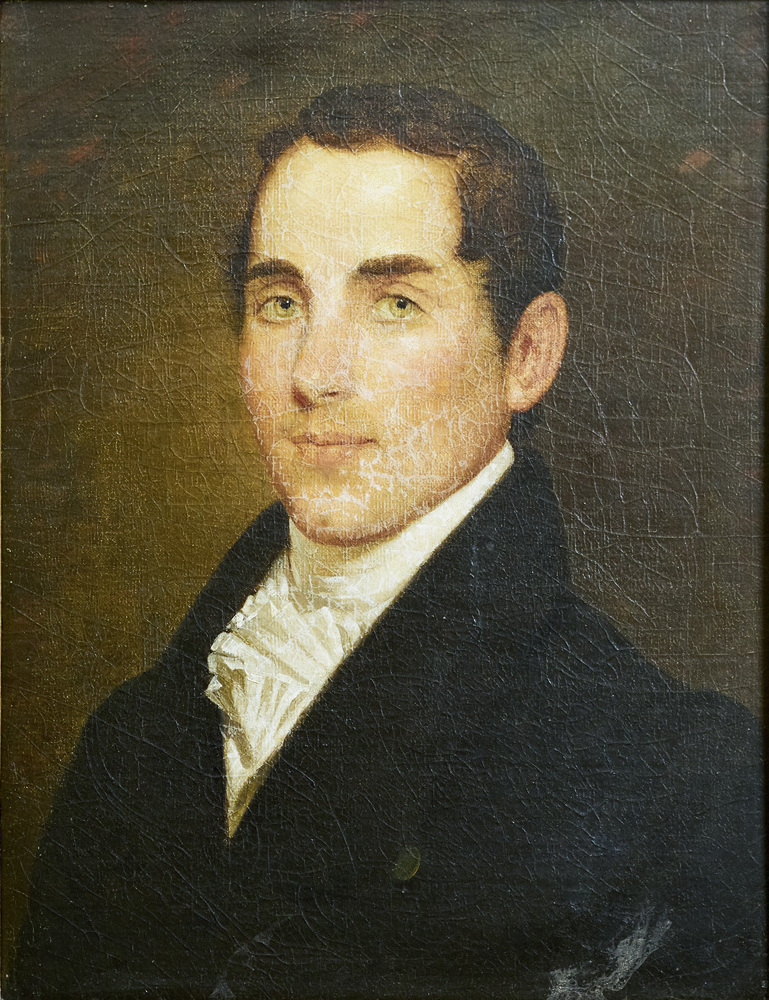
Francis Walker Gilmer was the subject of two published works by Davis, as well as his PhD thesis

In 1939, Davis published his first book, a biography titled Francis Walker Gilmer: Life and Learning in Jefferson's Virginia. Gilmer, a lawyer, had been hired by Thomas Jefferson to secure European faculty members for the newly founded University of Virginia. Davis had previously written a PhD thesis on Gilmer with the title "The Life, Letters, and Essays of Francis Walker Gilmer: A Study in Virginia Literary Culture in the First Quarter of the Nineteenth Century". The book was praised by Dumas Malone for being "the fullest and best account" of his life. G. Glenwood Clark praised its detailed index, but criticised the "gross carelessness in proof-reading, exasperating omission of words and phrases and frequent transpositions of whole sentences". In 1946, Davis published a further work on Gilmer titled Correspondence of Thomas Jefferson and Francis Walker Gilmer, 1814-1826. The work had been composed after the discovery of letters between the two men. Dumas Malone noted the benefit of having both sides of correspondence published in one place and praised the book's focus on both men and Gilmer's "poignant human story".

In 1950, Davis worked with Fredson Bowers to edit a bibliography of the Elizabethan writer and traveller George Sandys. He went on to publish a biography of Sandys in 1955, titled George Sandys, Poet-Adventurer: A Study in Anglo-American Culture in the Seventeenth Century. Davis's reference works continued with the first published edition of Thomas Holley Chivers' Life of Poe (known as Chivers' Life of Poe) in 1952, and a collection of historical writing by Augustus Foster in 1954. In 1955, he published a monograph on José Correia da Serra. Following its publication, he donated 128 items of research material to the library of the American Philosophical Society.

In 1961, Davis published two books: a collection of lectures by Samuel Lorenzo Knapp, originally published as Lectures on American Literature in 1829, and a collection of essays dedicated to John Cunyus Hodges and Alwin Thaler. The books were edited with Ben Harris McClary and John Leon Lievsay respectively. In 1963, he edited a collection of letters and documents by William Fitzhugh. In the same year, he entered the American Association for State and Local History's first manuscript competition, winning first place and a publication deal with the University of North Carolina Press. The manuscript was published under the title Intellectual Life in Jefferson's Virginia, 1790-1830 the following year, and is a study into the intellectual history of Virginia following the American Revolutionary War.

Over the next few years, Davis edited several more reference works, including a monograph on colonial satire, a collection of poems by the clergyman Samuel Davies, and a bibliography titled American Literature Through Bryant, 1585-1830. He published three edited works in 1970: an edition of William Wirt's Letters of the British Spy, an edition of James Fenimore Cooper's The Wept of Wish-ton-Wish and a collection of Southern writing with C. Hugh Holman and Louis D. Rubin Jr. In 1973, a selection of his articles and essays were published under the title Literature and Society in Early Virginia, 1608–1840.

Davis sat on the editorial board of the group publishing The Complete Works of Washington Irving. The general editors of the group were Henry A. Pochmann, Herbert L. Kleinfeld and Richard D. Rust, and the books were published intermittently from 1969 until 1989.

=== Intellectual Life in the Colonial South ===
In 1978, Davis published Intellectual Life in the Colonial South, 1585–1763, a three-volume study of the Southern United States, covering topics such as religion, politics, science and literature. The research for the book took over two decades to complete. In 1974, Davis was awarded a National Endowment for the Humanities Fellowship for the project.

In 1979, Intellectual Life in the Colonial South won the history category of the National Book Awards. The prize was judged by James H. Billington, Shelby Foote and Robin Winks. The citation for the award was as follows:

This ambitious and rewarding work rediscovers for modern Americans a vital regional culture, demonstrating the human richness of the Colonial South. The product of twenty-five years of exploration into neglected sources, this three-volume study will enlighten generations of readers. Not only does the book provide full information where little was previously available; it is also a work of high intellectual drama. This may be our most widely ranging inventory of a regional mind ever attempted in America. By reminding us of the validity and vitality of diverse American identities, it contributes to our understanding of ourselves. Good history must be interesting, it must be significant, and it must be true. The work of Richard Beale Davis shows all three of these qualities in abundance.

Davis received further accolades for the book, being awarded honorary degrees from the College of William and Mary as well as Eastern Kentucky University. In 1980, he was awarded the Charles S. Sydnor Award from the Southern Historical Association. He was also awarded the Outstanding Author of the Year Award from the Southeastern Library Association in 1980.

=== Later works ===
In 1979, his Mercer University Lamar Memorial Lectures were published under the title A Colonial Southern Bookshelf: Reading in the Eighteenth Century.

At the time of his death, Davis had been writing a book on "Intellectual Life in the Revolutionary South, 1763-1790". He had received a National Endowment for the Humanities Fellowship for the project in 1979. Davis had also been collaborating with Michael A. Lofaro and George M. Barringer on a bibliography of Southern manuscript sermons written before 1800. Work on the project had begun in 1946 as part of the research for Intellectual Life in the Colonial South. In 2010, Lofaro published Southern Manuscript Sermons before 1800: A Bibliography, dedicating the work to Davis and noting him as one of four contributing editors.

== Death and legacy ==
On March 30, 1981, he died at Fort Sanders Hospital in Knoxville following a heart attack. He is buried at Blandford Cemetery in Petersburg.

In 1981, the autumn edition of the Mississippi Quarterly journal was dedicated to Davis and the scholar C. Hugh Holman. In 1986, J. Lasley Dameron and James W. Mathews edited a collection of essays dedicated to Davis, titled No Fairer Land: Studies in Southern Literature Before 1900. All the book's contributors, including its editors, had been taught by Davis.

In December 1983, the Modern Language Association began awarding the annual Richard Beale Davis Prize for the best article published within the journal Early American Literature. Another award, the Richard Beale Davis Award for Distinguished Lifetime Service to Southern Letters, is awarded by the Society for the Study of Southern Literature every two years.

Davis's papers are located in the Betsey B. Creekmore Special Collections and University Archives at the University of Tennessee.

== Awards and honours ==
- Guggenheim Fellowship (1946; post-service fellowship)
- Folger Shakespeare Library Fellowship (1955)
- Doctor of Letters from Randolph–Macon College (1955)
- Guggenheim Fellowship (1959)
- Alumni Distinguished Service Award by the University of Tennessee (1962)
- American Association for State and Local History Manuscript Award (1963; for Intellectual Life in Jefferson's Virginia)
- Honorary member of the Virginia Historical Society (1972)
- Member of the American Antiquarian Society (1973)
- Festschrift upon retirement (c. 1977)
- Honored Scholar of the Modern Language Association's Early American Literature Group (1977)
- National Book Award for History (1979; for Intellectual Life in the Colonial South)
- Doctorate from College of William and Mary (for Intellectual Life in the Colonial South)
- Doctorate from Eastern Kentucky University (for Intellectual Life in the Colonial South)
- Southern Historical Association's Charles S. Sydnor Award (1980; for Intellectual Life in the Colonial South)
- Southeastern Library Association's Outstanding Author of the Year Award (1980; for Intellectual Life in the Colonial South)

== Publications ==
=== Books ===
Title	Time of first publication	First edition publisher/publication	Unique identifier	Notes
Francis Walker Gilmer: Life and Learning in Jefferson's Virginia	1939	Richmond, Virginia: Dietz Press	OCLC 1847322	Biography of Francis Walker Gilmer.
Correspondence of Thomas Jefferson and Francis Walker Gilmer, 1814-1826	1946	Columbia: University of South Carolina Press	OCLC 727833	Edited with introduction by Davis.
George Sandys: A Bibliographical Catalogue of Printed Editions in England to 1700	1950	New York: New York Public Library	OCLC 581229	With Fredson Bowers.
Chivers' Life of Poe	1952	New York: E. P. Dutton	OCLC 775268	Written by Thomas Holley Chivers; edited with introduction by Davis.
Jeffersonian America: Notes on the United States of America Collected in the Years 1805–6–7 and 11–12 by Sir Augustus John Foster, Bart.	1954	San Marino, California: The Huntington Library	OCLC 326952	Written by Augustus Foster; edited with introduction by Davis.
George Sandys, Poet-Adventurer: A Study in Anglo-American Culture in the Seventeenth Century	1955	New York: Columbia University Press	OCLC 351687	
American Cultural History, 1607-1829: A Facsimile reproduction of "Lectures on American Literature" (1829) by Samuel Lorenzo Knapp	1961	Gainesville, Florida: Scholars' Facsimiles & Reprints	OCLC 4028564	Edited with introduction by Davis and Ben Harris McClary.
Studies in Honor of John C. Hodges and Alwin Thaler	1961	Knoxville: University of Tennessee Press	OCLC 312082	Edited with introduction by Davis and John Leon Lievsay.
William Fitzhugh and His Chesapeake World, 1676-1701	1963	Chapel Hill: University of North Carolina Press	OCLC 1154134	Edited with introduction by Davis.
Intellectual Life in Jefferson's Virginia, 1790-1830	1964	Chapel Hill: University of North Carolina Press	OCLC 6787161	
Collected Poems of Samuel Davies, 1723-1761	1968	Gainesville, Florida: Scholars' Facsimiles & Reprints	OCLC 1104677842	Edited with introduction by Davis.
American Literature through Bryant, 1585-1830	1969	New York: Appleton-Century-Crofts	OCLC 64097	
The Letters of the British Spy by William Wirt, Esq.	1970	Chapel Hill: University of North Carolina Press	OCLC 1199631842	Edited with introduction by Davis.
The Wept of Wish-ton-Wish by James Fenimore Cooper	1970	Columbus, Ohio: Charles E. Merrill	OCLC 100559	Edited with introduction by Davis.
Southern Writing, 1585-1920	1970	New York: Odyssey Press	OCLC 118246	Edited by Davis, C. Hugh Holman and Louis D. Rubin Jr.
Literature and Society in Early Virginia, 1608–1840	1973	Baton Rouge: Louisiana State University Press	OCLC 668137	Collection of articles and essays by Davis.
Intellectual Life in the Colonial South, 1585–1763	1978	Knoxville: University of Tennessee Press	OCLC 2798780	Published in three volumes.
A Colonial Southern Bookshelf: Reading in the Eighteenth Century	1979	Athens: University of Georgia Press	OCLC 1267411152	
Southern Manuscript Sermons before 1800: A Bibliography	2010	Knoxville: Newfound Press	OCLC 654845439	Written by Michael A. Lofaro; Davis noted as contributing editor (posthumous).

=== Selected articles and essays ===
Title	Time of publication	Journal	Volume (Issue)	Page range	Unique identifier	Notes
"Forgotten Scientists in Old Virginia"	1938	The Virginia Magazine of History and Biography	46 (2)	97–111	JSTOR 4244852	
"Literary Tastes in Virginia Before Poe"	1939	The William and Mary Quarterly	19 (1)	55–68	JSTOR 1923042	
"Forgotten Scientists in Georgia and South Carolina"	1943	The Georgia Historical Quarterly	27 (3)	271–284	JSTOR 40576887	
"A Postscript on Thomas Jefferson and His University Professors"	1946	The Journal of Southern History	12 (3)	422–432	JSTOR 2198224	
"The Abbé Correa in America, 1812-1820: The Contributions of the Diplomat and Natural Philosopher to the Foundations of Our National Life"	1955	Transactions of the American Philosophical Society	45 (2)	87–197	JSTOR 1005770	Monograph on José Correia da Serra.
"The Devil in Virginia in the Seventeenth Century"	1957	The Virginia Magazine of History and Biography	65 (2)	131–149	JSTOR 4246295	
"Chesapeake Pattern and Pole-Star: William Fitzhugh in His Plantation World, 1676-1701"	1961	Proceedings of the American Philosophical Society	105 (6)	525–529	JSTOR 985162	
"The Colonial Virginia Satirist: Mid-Eighteenth-Century Commentaries on Politics, Religion, and Society"	1967	Transactions of the American Philosophical Society	57 (1)	1–74	JSTOR 1006008	Monograph; edited with introduction by Davis.
Review: Of Two Virginia Gentlemen and Their McGuire's University School: Richmond, Virginia, 1865-1942	1972	The Virginia Magazine of History and Biography	80 (4)	501–503	JSTOR 4247761	

== Externals links ==
- Richard Beale Davis at Find a Grave
