= Hayden High School =

Hayden High School may refer to one of the following:

- Hayden High School (Alabama) in Hayden, Alabama
- Hayden High School (Arizona) in Hayden-Winkelman, Arizona
- Hayden High School (Colorado) in Hayden, Colorado
- Hayden High School (Topeka, Kansas) in Topeka, Kansas
- Hayden High School (Franklin, Virginia), listed on the National Register of Historic Places
