= National Register of Historic Places listings in Franklin, Virginia =

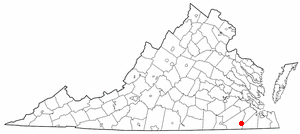
Location of Franklin in Virginia

This is a list of the National Register of Historic Places listings in Franklin, Virginia.

This is intended to be a complete list of the properties and districts on the National Register of Historic Places in the independent city of Franklin, Virginia, United States. The locations of National Register properties and districts for which the latitude and longitude coordinates are included below, may be seen in an online map.

There are 5 properties and districts listed on the National Register in the city.

This National Park Service list is complete through NPS recent listings posted June 20, 2025.

== Current listings ==
	Name on the Register	Image	Date listed	Location	Description
1	The Elms	The Elms	September 9, 1982 (#82004556)	Clay St. 36°40′46″N 76°55′58″W	
2	Franklin High School Gymnasium and Agricultural & Shop Building	Franklin High School Gymnasium and Agricultural & Shop Building	February 26, 2020 (#100005009)	511 Charles St. 36°40′36″N 76°55′40″W	
3	Franklin Historic District	Franklin Historic District	May 9, 1985 (#85000988)	U.S. Routes 58 and 258; 36°40′35″N 76°55′31″W	
4	Hayden High School	Hayden High School	February 5, 2013 (#12001268)	610-678 Oak St. 36°39′57″N 76°55′34″W	
5	Woods Hill	Woods Hill	February 5, 2014 (#13001161)	1501 Clay St. 36°40′55″N 76°57′33″W	

== See also ==
- List of National Historic Landmarks in Virginia
- National Register of Historic Places listings in Virginia
