= Robert Jacobs =

Robert Jacobs may refer to:

- Robert Nelson Jacobs (born 1954), American screenwriter
- Robert Allan Jacobs (1905–1993), American architect
- Robert D. Jacobs (died 1998), American scholar of the literature of the Southern United States
- Robert Jacobs (Homefront), a character in the videogame Homefront
- Robert Jacobs, a character in the video game Call of Duty: Vanguard
- Rob Jacobs (born 1943), Dutch footballer
