= Woods Hill =

Historic house in Virginia, United States

- U.S. National Register of Historic Places
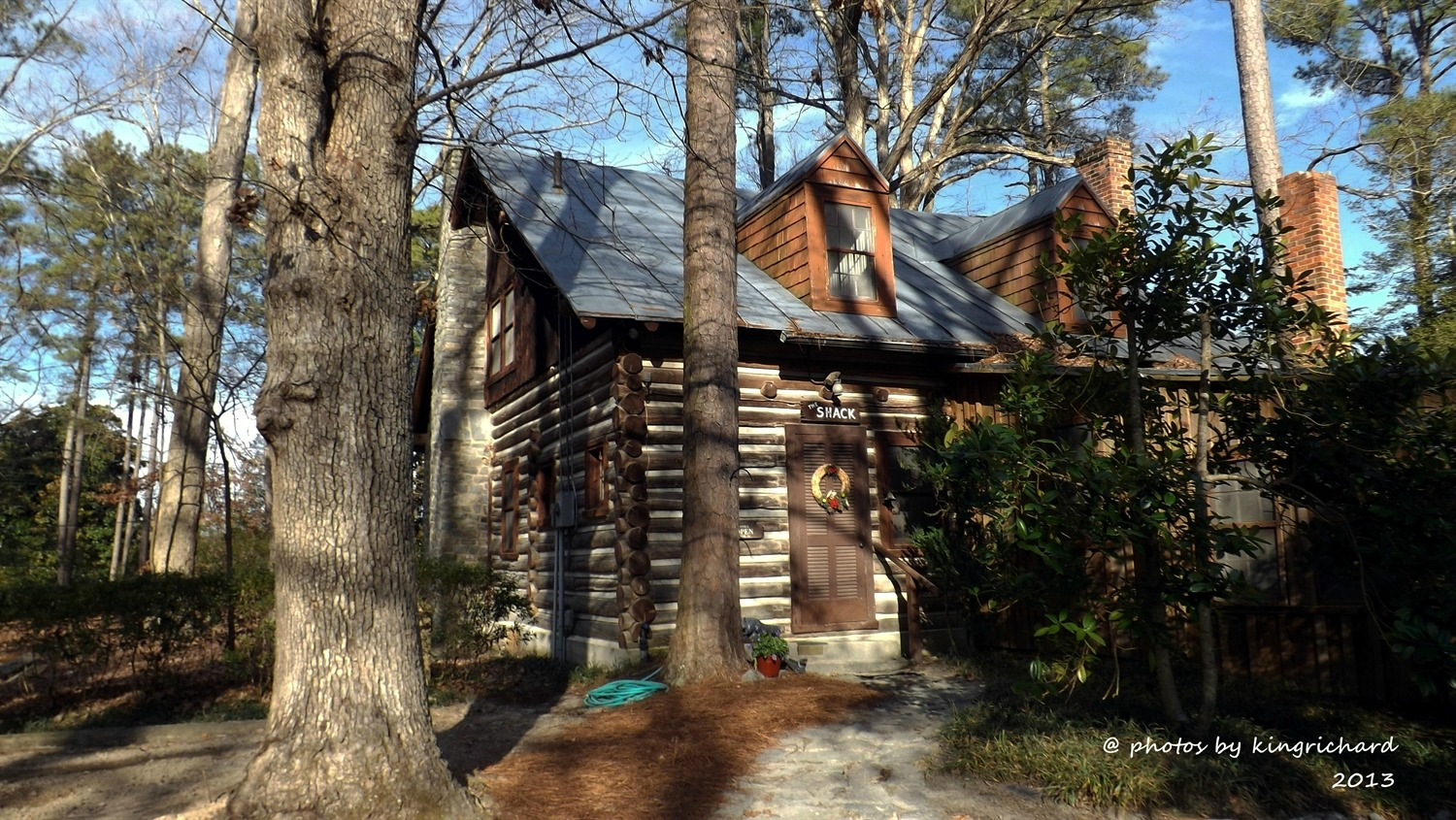
- Log cabin

- Location within Virginia Location within the United States
- Location: 1501 Clay St., Franklin, Virginia
- Coordinates: 36°40′55″N 76°57′34″W
- Area: 17.3 acres (7.0 ha)
- Built: 1951
- NRHP reference No.: 13001161
- Added to NRHP: February 5, 2014

Woods Hill is an historic estate at 1501 Clay Street in Franklin, Virginia. The 17-acre (6.9 ha) estate is notable for its house, designed by architect Alan McCullough and built in 1951, and its landscaping, designed by Charles Freeman Gillette. The house is a two-story brick structure, built out of custom bricks laid in Old English Bond and mortared using rough edging mortar. The property includes a log cabin and old service station (established by the building owner's father) that were located on the rural parcel.

The property was listed on the National Register of Historic Places in 2014.

== See also ==
- National Register of Historic Places listings in Franklin, Virginia
