= Alan McCullough =

Alan McCullough may refer to:

- Alan McCullough (architect) (died 1993), American modernist architect
- Alan McCullough (loyalist) (1981–2003), Ulster Defence Association member
