= William Lindsay =

William, Billy or Bill Lindsay may refer to:

== Politics ==
- William Lindsay (diplomat) (fl. 1790s), Scottish diplomat and colonial governor
- William Lindsay (Canadian politician) (1813–1895), Irish-born merchant and political figure in New Brunswick, Canada
- William Schaw Lindsay (1815–1877), British merchant and member of parliament for Tynemouth and North Shields, and Sunderland
- William Burns Lindsay Jr. (1824–1872), clerk of the House of Commons of Canada
- William Lindsay (Kentucky politician) (1835–1909), U.S. senator from Kentucky
- William Lindsay (Wisconsin politician) (1840–1927), Republican member of the Wisconsin State Assembly
- William Arthur Lindsay (1866–1936), member of parliament for Belfast South, 1917–1918, and Belfast Cromac, 1918–1922
- William M. Lindsay (1880–1957), American politician, lieutenant governor of Kansas
- William J. Lindsay (1945–2013), American politician in Suffolk County, New York

== Sports ==
- Bill Lindsay (born 1971), American ice hockey player
- Bill Lindsay (third baseman) (1881–1963), American baseball player
- Bill Lindsay (pitcher) (1891–1914), American Negro leagues pitcher
- Bill Lindsay (rugby union)
- Billy Lindsay (1872–1933), English footballer for Everton, Grimsby Town, Newcastle United, Luton Town and Watford
- William Lindsay (baseball) (1905–2006), American Negro league shortstop
- William Lindsay (field hockey) (1916–1971), British field hockey player
- William Lindsay (English footballer) (1847–1923), England international footballer, three times FA Cup winner
- William Lindsay (Scottish footballer) (1886–1976), Scottish footballer for Morton and Glentoran

== Other ==
- William Lindsay of Dowhill (died 1679), Scottish Presbyterian minister
- William Lindsay, 18th Earl of Crawford (died 1698), Scottish noble and Presbyterian
- William Lindsay (minister) (1802–1866), Scottish United Presbyterian minister
- William Lindsay (officer of arms) (1846–1926), officer of arms at the College of Arms in London
- William Bethune Lindsay (1880–1933), Canadian military officer during World War I
- William O'Brien Lindsay (1909–1975), Chief Justice of the Sudan, first-class cricketer
- William Lindsay (actor) (1945–1986), British television actor
- William Lindsay (shipowner) (1819–1884), Scottish lawyer and shipowner, Lord Provost of Leith
- William Lauder Lindsay (1829–1880), Scottish botanist

== See also ==
- Bill Lindsey (born 1960), baseball catcher
- William Lindsey (fl. 1920s), Negro league baseball player
- William B. Lindsey, member of the Virginia House of Delegates
