= Chivers' Life of Poe =

1952 biography

- Editor: Richard Beale Davis
- Author: Thomas Holley Chivers
- Subject: Edgar Allan Poe
- Publisher: E. P. Dutton and Company
- Publication date: February 28, 1952
- Pages: 127
- OCLC: 220128818

Chivers' Life of Poe is a biography concerning the American writer and poet Edgar Allan Poe as written by his friend and fellow poet Thomas Holley Chivers. The majority of the work remained in manuscript form as the "New Life of Edgar Allan Poe" until 1952, when it was edited and published by the American academic Richard Beale Davis.

Following the wave of criticism from Rufus Wilmot Griswold that followed Poe's death, Chivers began writing a biography aimed at defending the deceased poet's legacy. While he finished it during the 1850s, it remained unpublished until excerpts were published by George Edward Woodberry in 1903. Another five decades passed before the manuscripts for Chivers's "New Life of Edgar Allan Poe" were arranged and published by Richard Beale Davis in 1952 as Chivers' Life of Poe.

Critics praised Richard Beale Davis's abilities in editing the Chivers manuscript, but disagreed on whether the general reader would find his notes to be a help or a hindrance. Several reviewers said that the biography was factually inaccurate and was untrustworthy when talking about Poe. It was suggested that the book was a good way to understand the views of Poe's contemporaries.

== Background ==
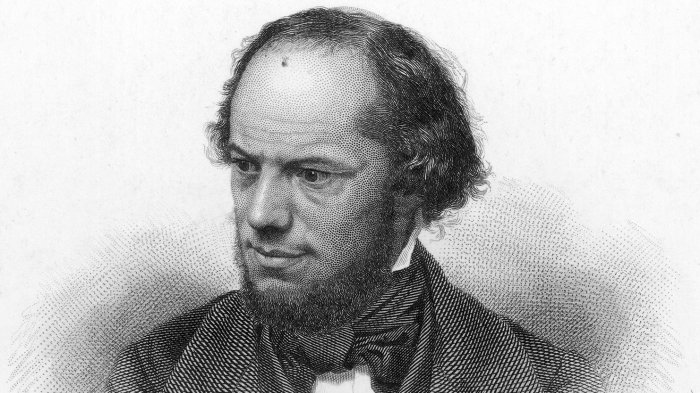
Rufus Wilmot Griswold, pictured in 1855, wrote an obituary of Poe which Chivers set out to discredit.

Direct contact between Edgar Allan Poe and Thomas Holley Chivers began in the 1840s, and they continued to correspond with each other as friends until Poe's death in 1849. After this occurred, Chivers began publicly accusing Poe of plagiarizing his work and was accused of stealing from Poe's own writing. Despite these accusations, Chivers continued to defend his friend's legacy.

In October 1849, shortly after Poe's death, Rufus Wilmot Griswold published a scathing critique and obituary in the New-York Tribune (published under the pseudonym "Ludwig"). The following September, he included his "Memoir of the Author" in a collection of Poe's works. The effect of the memoir had been to destroy Poe's reputation and may have directly inspired Chivers to write a biography defending his friend. Edward Sculley Bradley at the University of Pennsylvania said that his attempts to discredit Griswold's accounts were "evident" within the final work.

Chivers began researching Poe's life and gathering related materials: he had already collected clippings from magazines and newspapers including Graham's Magazine, the Broadway Journal, the Southern Literary Messenger, and the New-York Tribune. Chivers contacted Poe's relatives and acquaintances to read their communications with Poe, even asking Griswold for his letters. In October 1852, he offered his "New Life of Edgar Allan Poe" to the publishing company Ticknor and Fields, but was unsuccessful. In February 1854, he sought publication with B. B. Mussey and Co. and Lippincott, Grambo & Co., but was again unsuccessful. The manuscript remained unpublished by Chivers, but he appeared to work on it until 1857.

=== Publication of excerpts ===
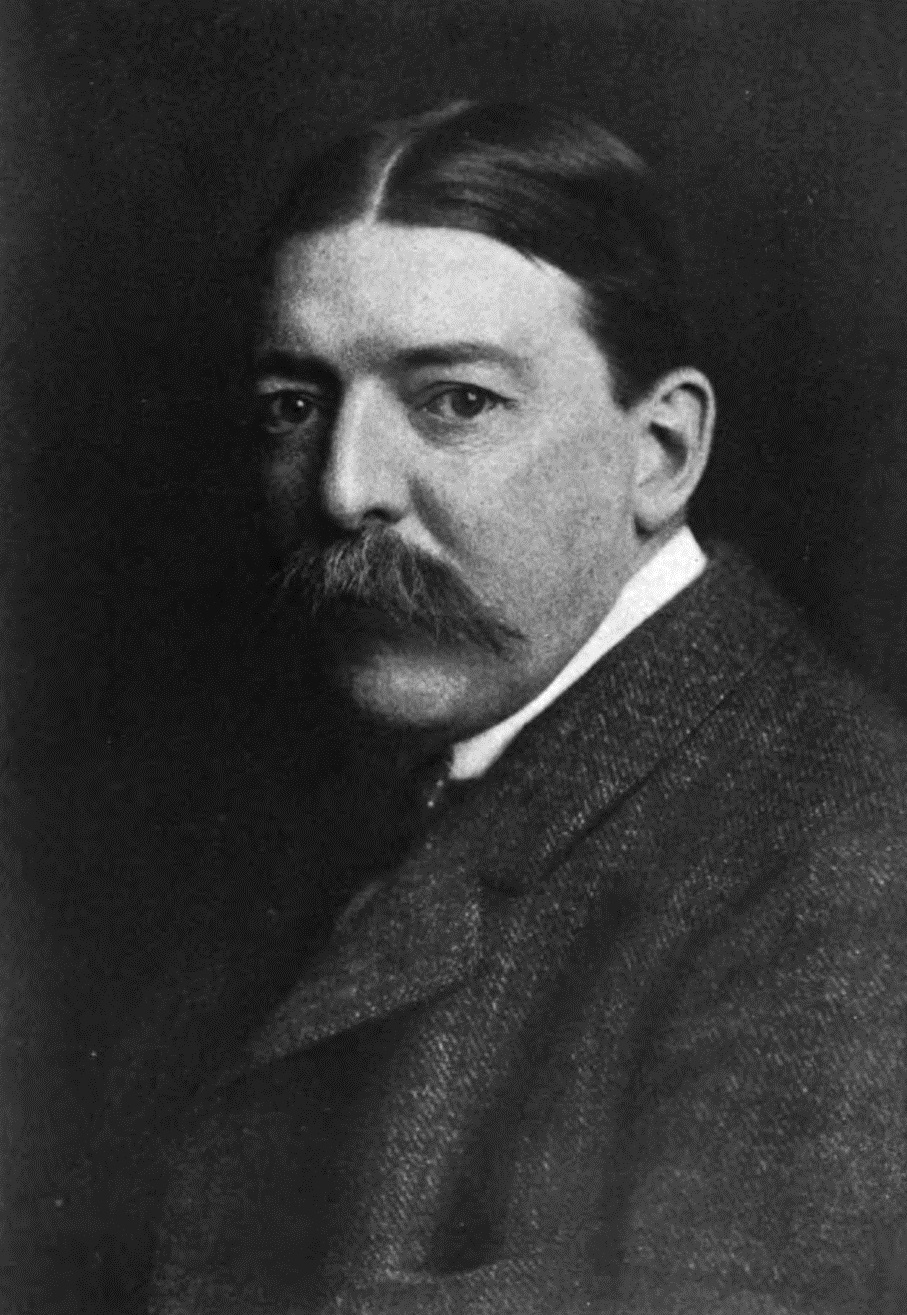
George Edward Woodberry published the first excerpts of the Poe-Chivers Papers

In January and February 1903, George Edward Woodberry published two articles in The Century Magazine titled "The Poe-Chivers Papers: The First Authentic Account of One of Poe's Most Interesting Friendships", which contained excerpts from Chivers's manuscript collection. By this time, Woodberry had established himself as a leading scholar in Poe studies, publishing his own biography of the writer in 1885. Duke University professor Jay B. Hubbell criticised Woodberry's publication of the excerpts as being done "in part and none too accurately".

The first of The Century's articles contains Chivers's physical description of Poe and recounts their interactions in New York City. It includes a discussion between Chivers and Poe concerning the poet Percy Bysshe Shelley. The second contains the section titled "Golden Letters" and notes Chivers's manuscript dedication to Shelley: "To the Eternal Spirit of the Immortal Shelley, this work is now most Solemnly dedicated, by one who longs to enjoy his company in Elysium".

=== Modern research and editing ===
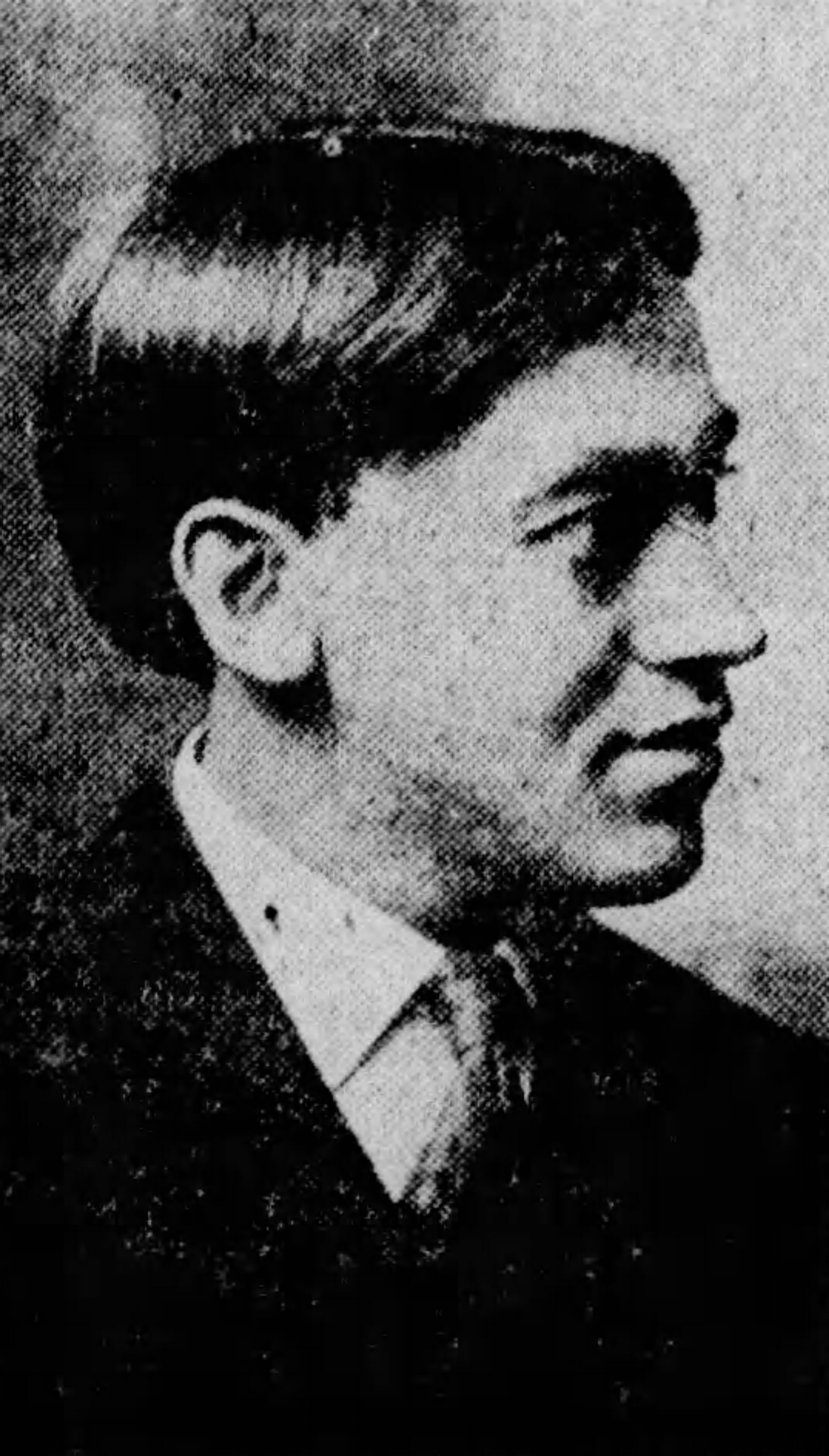
Lewis Chase began researching Chivers's manuscripts in the 1920s

In 1927, California Institute of Technology visiting professor Lewis Chase began exploring the Poe-Chivers Papers at the Huntington Library in San Marino, California. Chase had originally intended to focus on Poe, but began to research Chivers instead: he later started a collection of the writer's papers at the libraries at Duke University and began editing his collected works with S. Foster Damon (Chase's wife Emma Chase finished the work).

The papers at the Huntington Library were once again consulted when Richard Beale Davis began his research into Chivers. Davis was a professor of English who had worked at the University of South Carolina and the University of Tennessee. He had published three books prior to 1952, as well as various journal articles and reviews within the field of Poe studies.

According to Davis, the "New Life of Edgar Allan Poe" manuscripts were in a state of disorganisation when he consulted them:

The writing appears on several kinds of paper. Many of the longer and more finished sections cover long foolscap sheets, once white. Even over sections of these, however, have been pasted slips on which appear second-thought sentences or paragraphs. Other material inserted (by Chivers himself) in these larger "completed" units is on small blue correspondence paper. And there are still smaller half-sheets and loose slips closely written. Markings and crossings through and insertions are frequent in most of the work.

As such, he rearranged the manuscripts into an order which he felt made the most sense.

== Synopsis ==
Chivers' Life of Poe, as edited by Richard Beale Davis, is split into twelve sections with an introduction and explanatory notes by the editor. Davis begins the introduction with an explanation of the relationship between Chivers and Poe before discussing the research and writing of Chivers's "New Life of Edgar Allan Poe".

In the first section, "Preliminary Remarks", Chivers lays out his intentions for writing the biography. He republishes a poem by R. S. Nichols titled "The Dead Year" and explains that he does not intend to ignore Poe's struggles with alcohol or cover up his vices. At several points, he directly responds to critics of Poe, including Phillip Pendleton Cooke and Griswold: he attacks the latter's memoir and insults his general intellect. The second section, titled "Birth, Life and Death", contains a brief biographical account of Poe's life, covering everything from his schooling, to his career as a writer, to his death. This is followed immediately by the "Golden Letters" section (seen in Woodberry's second article), a short description of the first correspondence between Poe and Chivers, and a narrative account of their interactions in New York City (seen in Woodberry's first article).

The book continues with the sixth section, "Poe's Personal Appearance", which was also published in Woodberry's first article. Chivers continues this section with a further account of meeting Poe in New York City alongside magazine editor Lewis Gaylord Clark. The next section, "Virginia and Alcohol", contains an 1848 letter from Poe to George Washington Eveleth and an excerpt from a Southern Literary Messenger article by Cooke concerning Poe's last visit to Richmond, Virginia. The eighth section directly attacks Griswold in his role as Poe's literary executor and contains an edited version of a letter by Poe's mother-in-law Maria Clemm, which points out errors in Griswold's memoir.

Chivers continues his biography with a section of literary criticism titled "Poe as Poet", which republishes the poems "To Helen" and "The Departed". Alongside these, he accuses Poe of plagiarising his own work. The next section, "Poe's Tales", praises his short stories "Eleonora" and "Shadow - A Parable". The eleventh section is titled "Poe's Criticism" and contains excerpts from Poe's published reviews in the Broadway Journal and Graham's Magazine. The biography ends with "Analysis of his Genius", which discusses Poe's apparent views on art, philosophy, and poetry. It concludes with a critique of Henry Wadsworth Longfellow compared to Poe.

== Publication and reception ==
Timeline
Date	Event
1809	Poe born
1840s	Chivers/Poe "friendship"
1849	Poe dies Griswold obituary attacks Poe
1852	Chivers tries to publish Poe biography
1903	Woodberry publishes Chivers excerpts
1927	Chase studies Chivers' works
1952	Davis edits Chivers' Life of Poe

The book was published as Chivers' Life of Poe by E. P. Dutton and Company on February 28, 1952. It was one of several books published by the company to celebrate its centennial. The first edition was limited to 1500 copies.

=== Editorial scholarship ===
Writing together in The Journal of Southern History, Lois Ferry Parks and Emma Chase praised and criticised what they referred to as Davis's "splendid job of editing". They said that he was able to make a "reasonable narrative" from Chivers's manuscripts and that his notes were "for the most part textually correct and yet unobtrusive", but also noted a range of transcription and factual errors made by the editor. Overall, however, they argued that "the mistakes noted are of minor concern".

Southern literature scholar Robert D. Jacobs wrote that Davis was "an experienced and capable scholar" and said that the book's introductions and notes would be easy for both academics and the general reader to follow. Writing in the Chicago Tribune, Walter Harding said that general readers might find Davis's editorial work "a little annoying at times".

=== Historical accuracy ===
Arthur H. Quinn at the University of Pennsylvania wrote in American Literature that the book contains several factual errors relating to Poe's early life, but dismisses this as "not by any means Chivers's fault". He discussed how misunderstandings in Chivers's writing create a "distrust of his evidence", giving the example of Poe's letter to George Washington Eveleth concerning the cause of his drinking. Quinn questioned the need to publish the manuscripts at all and suggested doing so may revive scandals related to the relationship between Poe and Frances Sargent Osgood.

The Virginia Quarterly Review described the book as "untrustworthy as evidence about Poe", but recommended it as a way of understanding Chivers. Los Angeles Times literary critic Paul Jordan-Smith referred to it as "a bad biography", but suggested it would help students understand views contemporary to Poe. University of Virginia professor Armistead C. Gordon Jr. said that Chivers's biography was "a patchwork of inconsistencies, vague theorizing, and patronizing connection".
