= Union Camp Corporation =

American pulp and paper company

- Type: Public
- Traded as: NYSE: UCC (until 1999)
- Industry: Pulp and paper, forest products
- Founded: July 12, 1956; 70 years ago New York City, New York
- Defunct: April 30, 1999; 27 years ago
- Fate: Acquired
- Successor: International Paper
- Headquarters: Wayne, New Jersey, United States

Union Camp Corporation was an American pulp and paper company and a private owner of timberland in the United States. In 1999 it was acquired by International Paper.

== Company creation ==
Union Camp came about through the merger of the Union Bag and Paper Company and the Camp Manufacturing Company. Each of these family-owned companies had unique histories that led to the ultimate success of Union Camp until it was acquired by International Paper.

=== Union Bag and Paper Company ===
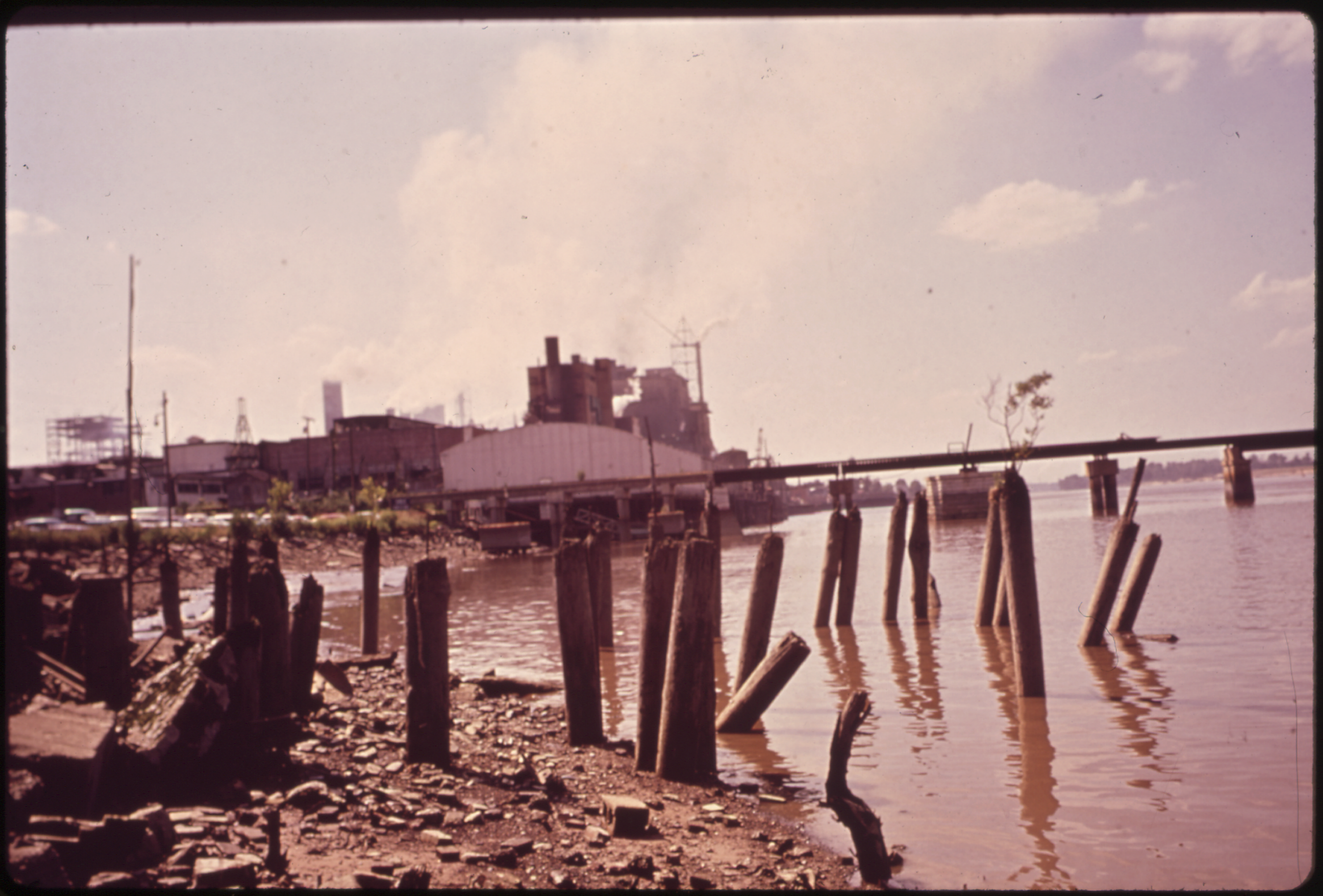
Union Camp plant in Savannah

The Union Bag and Paper Company's history dates back to 1881, where it began as the Union Paper Bag Machine Company in Bethlehem, Pennsylvania under the Calder family. In the late 1920s, partially due to concerns about the labor union movement in the north, the company built a major mill (the largest in the world at the time and for many years) in Savannah, Georgia, on land formerly occupied by the Hermitage Plantation. This mill, and local politics, were the subject of Ralph Nader's book, The Water Lords. The company had a major impact on Savannah politics, but was highly respected in the area as having kept Savannah from many of the severe effects of the Great Depression. The Savannah mill has a public golf course, named after Mary Calder, wife of the founder.

=== Camp Manufacturing Company ===
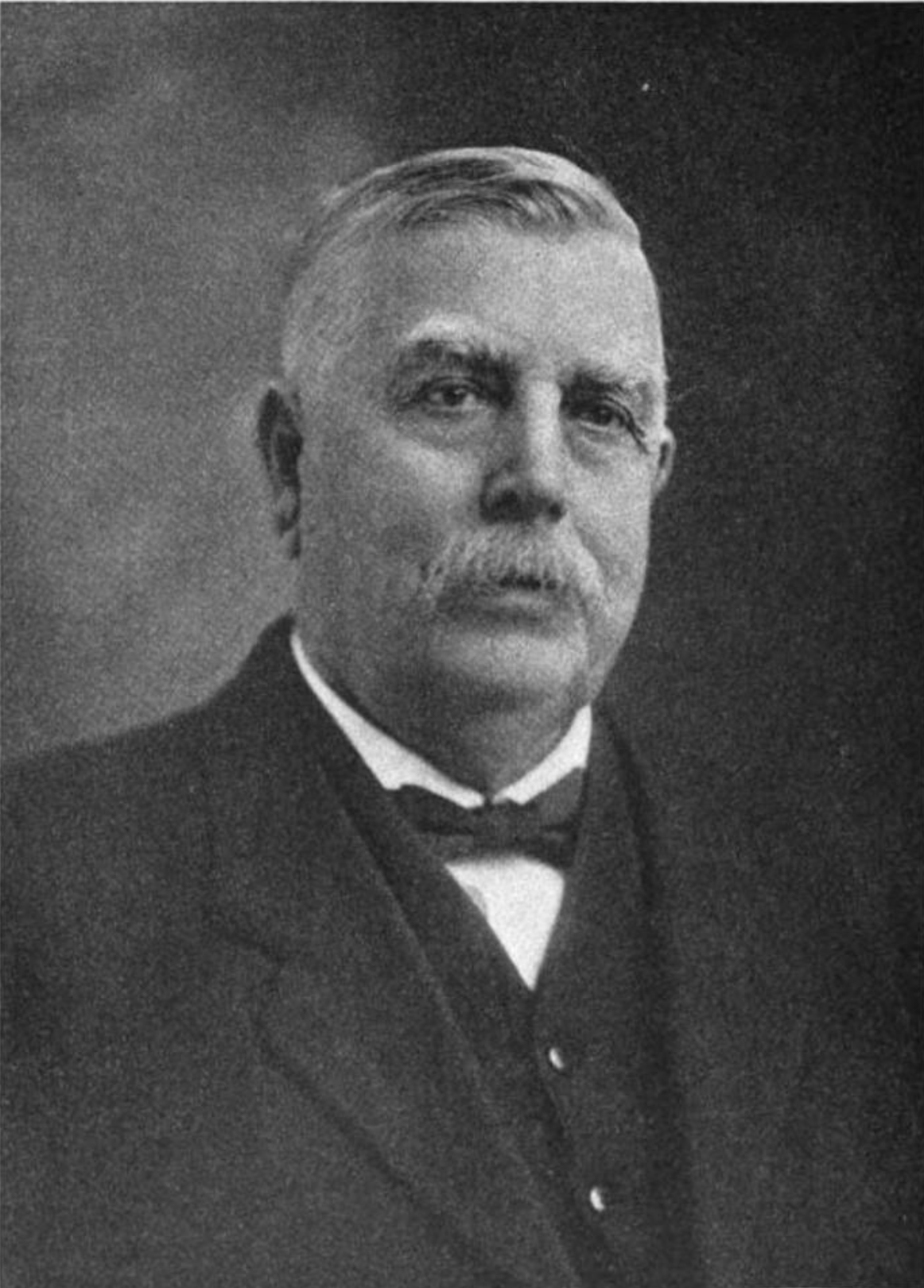
Paul D. Camp (c. 1924)

The Camp Manufacturing Company was founded in 1887 by three local Camp brothers from Franklin, Virginia. Paul Douglas Camp (president), James Leonidas Camp (vice-president) and Robert Judson Camp (secretary-treasurer) purchased a small sawmill on the outskirts of Franklin. Paul Douglas Camp built The Elms, listed on the National Register of Historic Places in 1982. The sawmill was purchased from Dr. Jimmy Jordan of Como, North Carolina. Under Dr. Jim Jordan, Camp Manufacturing Company of Franklin prospered and steadily increased in volume. By 1949 it utilized four log trucks, each with several times the load capacity of the first one. The business was grossing about $90 thousand a year.

With their new sawmill, they began expanding it and over the next 20 years experienced rapid growth. After a bout with near bankruptcy in 1907, the brothers borrowed the money necessary to continue operations. With the onset of World War I, the increased demand for lumber brought the company back to financial success. By 1918, the success of the company was obvious through the observations of the local community Franklin. With the stimulated economy, "Franklin has become a booming wartime village..." In 1925, with the passing of the final first generation Camps, the company was passed on to the second generation. This new generation brought the company into the paper production industry, starting with brown packaging paper in 1938 and eventually producing specialty bleached paper in the 1950s. By the mid 1950s, the industry competition was growing fierce with onset of extensive mergers within the industry and the Camp family needed resources to expand their capital intensive paper production. Until this time, the Camp family was in possession of 74% of slightly over a million shares of their company. Reluctant to forfeit this control by becoming a publicly traded company, the Camp family looked for other avenues. After meeting with several potential buyers, many who were disgusted at Hugh Camps high asking price, a buyer was found.

=== The merger ===
In May 1956, the merger between the 2 companies came together. With Union Bag company having sales of $123,031,000 and owning over a million acres (4,000 km²) of timber, it was surprising that the Camps negotiated as equals with the Calders, when the Camps had a fraction of the sales and property with $27,675,225 in sales and 240,000 acres (970 km²) of timber. After months of negotiations, and a final offering to the Camp shareholders of 1.75 shares for every share owned, a deal was struck. On 13 July 1956 the merger was completed and the Union Bag-Camp Paper company was born.

In the late 1950s, a product made from kraft paper was created for applications such as a core in doors, aircraft construction, marine applications, etc., wherever strength with light weight and buoyancy were critical. The product was called "Honeycomb" and it was unique in that it resembled a beehive, with the edges of the cells giving overall greater strength wherever it was used. The size of the cells could be changed and the thickness of the sheets could be varied to suit the application. It could also be impregnated with resins to make it stronger and waterproof. The manufacturing plant for this product was at Glens Falls, New York and a technical staff was maintained there for architects and engineers. Also, at this site in Glens Falls, Union Camp maintained a cave-like storage facility where microfilms of all the company's important documents, such as contracts and legal papers, were sent after filming. The necessity or inspiration for such an operation was the Cold War.

On March 15, 1966, the company introduced a new logotype reading simply "Union Camp" on the cover of its 1965 annual report, designed by Lippincott & Margulies. This precipitated the shortening of the company's name to Union Camp Corporation, which would be approved by shareholders on April 26, 1966.

== From merger to merger ==
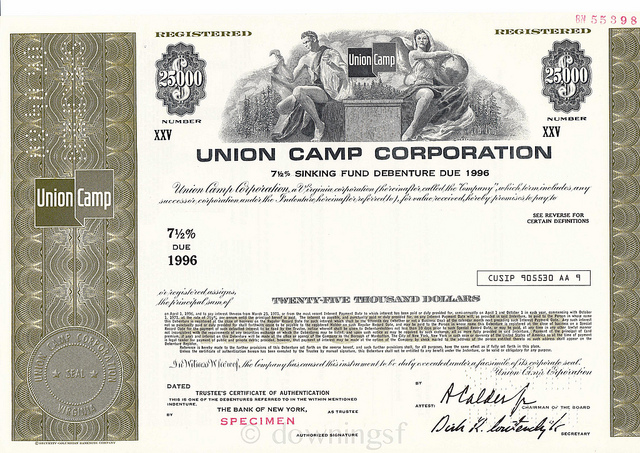
Union Camp Corporation - A Specimen "Sinking Fund" Bond Certificate c.1971

== The final days ==
In 1999, the Union Camp Corporation was acquired by International Paper. At the time it was referred to as a "merger," but was actually a takeover. Union Camp's CEO at that time was W. Craig McClelland. Earlier he had presided over the sale of Hammermill Paper Company to International Paper, in 1986, when President & CEO of that company. Hammermill had encountered financial difficulties due to activities of Wall Street speculators. McClelland finally retired from International Paper's Board of Directors in late 2006.

== Sources ==
- Rouse, Parke Jr., The Timber Tycoons - The Camp Families of Virginia and Florida, and their empire, 1887-1987. The William Byrd Press, 1988. OCLC 48020084.
