= Franklin Historic District (Virginia) =

Historic district in Virginia, United States

- U.S. National Register of Historic Places
- U.S. Historic district
- Virginia Landmarks Register
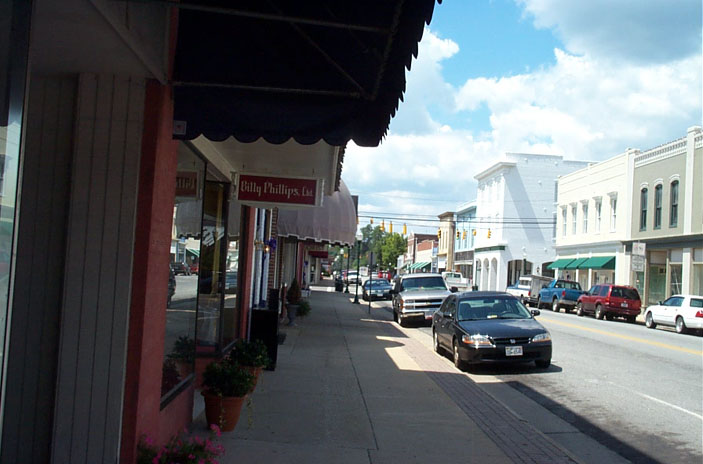
- Downtown Franklin in 2001

- Location within Virginia Location within the United States
- Location: US 58 and US 258, Franklin, Virginia
- Coordinates: 36°41′33″N 77°32′20″W
- Area: 86 acres (35 ha)
- Architect: Multiple
- Architectural style: Late 19th And 20th Century Revivals, Late Victorian, Federal
- NRHP reference No.: 85000988, 04000853 (Boundary Increase)
- VLR No.: 145-0006

Significant dates
- Added to NRHP: May 9, 1985, August 11, 2004 (Boundary Increase)
- Designated VLR: April 16, 1985, June 16, 2004, January 26, 2005

Franklin Historic District is a national historic district located at Franklin, Virginia. The district includes 226 contributing buildings and 1 contributing site in the city of Franklin. It includes residential and commercial buildings that were primarily built during the late 19th- and early 20th-century. Notable resources include the Poplar Springs Cemetery, Camp Family Homestead (c. 1840), the former W.T. Pace Hardware Store, former U.S. Post Office (1916), Franklin Professional Building (1920s), Lyons State Theatre (1930s), Pretlow Peanut Company Warehouses, High Street Methodist Church (1890s), Emmanuel Episcopal / Grace Lutheran Church, and Franklin Elementary School (1922). Located in the district is the separately listed The Elms.

It was listed on the National Register of Historic Places in 1985, with a boundary increase in 2004.
