= Della Irving Hayden =

American educator (1851–1924)

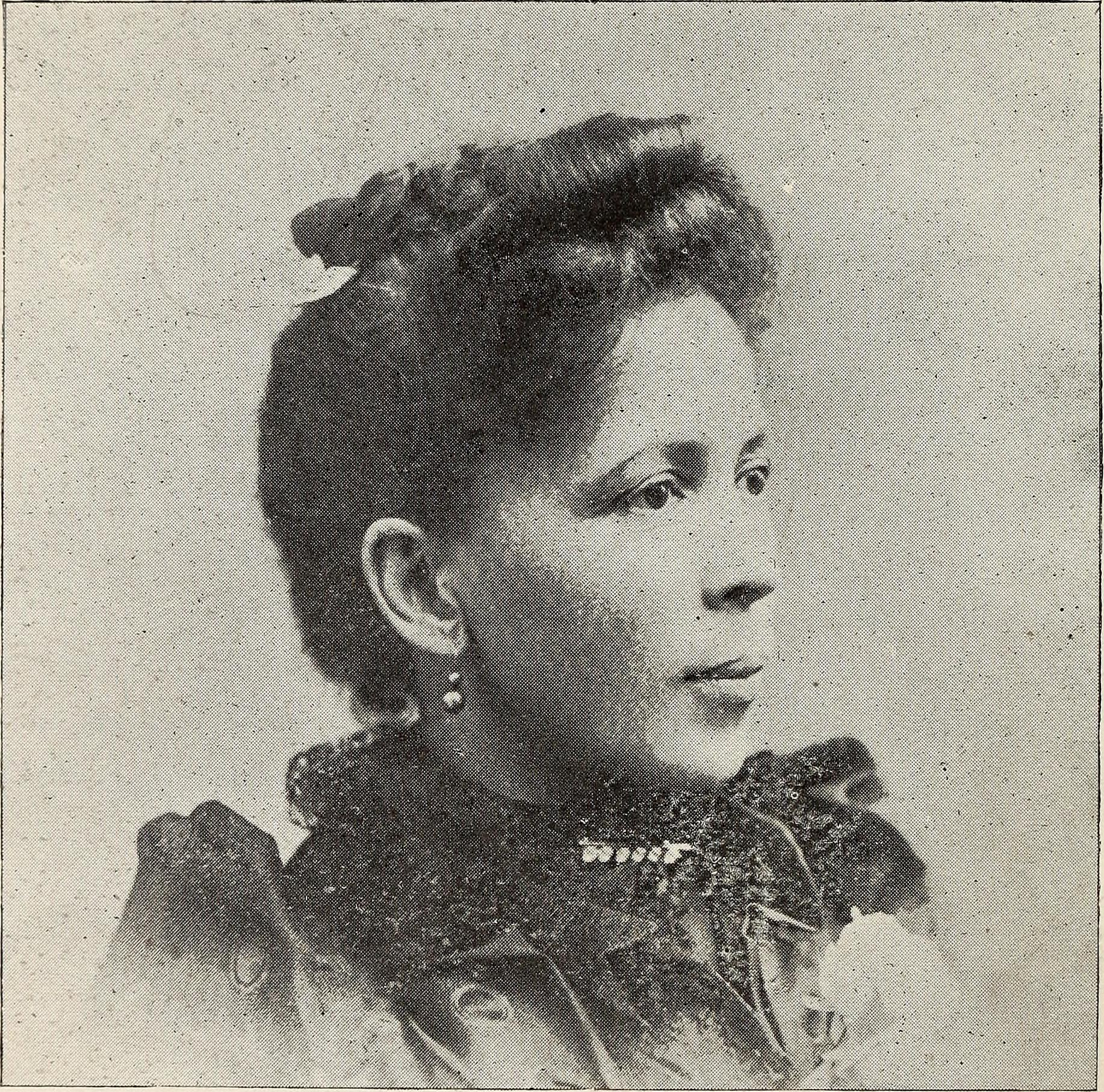
- Della Irving Hayden, from an 1893 publication
- Born: c. 1851; United States
- Died: 1924; Franklin, Virginia, United States
- Education: Hampton Normal and Agricultural Institute
- Occupations: Educator, club woman
- Known for: Founded and led Franklin Normal and Industrial Institute
- Spouse: Lindsay Hayden (m. 1880; his death)

Della Irving Hayden (c. 1851–1924) was an American educator. She founded in 1904, Franklin Normal and Industrial Institute in Franklin, Virginia.

== Early life ==
Della Irving was born into slavery and raised by a grandmother in Tarboro, North Carolina until she was reunited with her mother Charlotte Irving in 1865, after Emancipation.

She attended school in Franklin, Virginia, and graduated in 1877 from Hampton Normal and Agricultural Institute (now Hampton University). At Hampton she knew fellow students Booker T. Washington and his first wife Fannie Smith Washington. Della Irving spoke at Hampton's graduation exercises in 1877, on "Our Work as Women", and won a cash prize presented by the First Lady, Lucy Webb Hayes.

== Career ==
Della Irving began teaching in rural Virginia in 1875, during a break from her studies at Hampton. In 1881, Hayden was elected principal of a school in Franklin, a position she held for nine years. In 1890, she returned to her alma mater to serve as "lady principal" at the Hampton Normal and Agricultural Institute. She was also "lady principal" of the State Normal School at Petersburg for thirteen years. In 1904, she organized the Franklin Normal and Industrial Institute, and was its principal. By 1916 Franklin had buildings and a land to run a small farm and board dozens of women students, funded mainly by donations solicited by Hayden. "I have been trying to teach my people to help themselves. It has been my heart's desire to help elevate my race," she wrote.

She led local chapters of the Women's Christian Temperance Union and the Home Missionary Society, as well as presiding over the Virginia Teachers' Temperance Union. She was active with the Young Women's Christian Association. She also held officer positions in the county's Sunday School Union.

== Personal life and legacy ==
Della Irving married a school principal and fellow Hampton alumnus, Lindsay Hayden, in 1880; he died within a few months after their wedding. She died in 1924, aged 73 years, in the first known fatal automobile accident in Franklin.

A large monument was erected in her memory at Southview Cemetery in 1927, and in 1953 Hayden High School in Franklin was named in her honor (the site is now the Hayden Village Center, a residence and community center for seniors run by Senior Citizens of Southeastern Virginia).

In 2016, Hayden was included as one of "The 15 Most Influential People in Western Tidewater History" by Progress magazine.

In 2018, the Virginia Capitol Foundation announced that Hayden's name would be on the Virginia Women's Monument's glass Wall of Honor.
