= Franklin Municipal–John Beverly Rose Airport =

Franklin Municipal Airport John Beverly Rose Field

- IATA: FKN; ICAO: KFKN; FAA LID: FKN

Summary
- Airport type: Public
- Owner: City of Franklin
- Serves: Franklin, Virginia
- Elevation AMSL: 41 ft (12 m)
- Coordinates: 36°41′53″N 076°54′14″W
- Interactive map of Franklin Municipal Airport

Runways
Direction	Length		Surface
Direction	ft	m	Surface
9/27	4,977	1,517	Asphalt

Statistics (2007)
- Aircraft operations: 5,012
- Based aircraft: 25
- Source: Airport website and FAA

Franklin Municipal–John Beverly Rose Airport, also known as Franklin Municipal Airport or John Beverly Rose Field (IATA: FKN, ICAO: KFKN, FAA LID: FKN) is a public airport in Isle of Wight County, Virginia, United States. The airport is owned by the City of Franklin and is located at 32470 John Beverly Rose Drive, two nautical miles (4 km) northeast of the city's central business district.

== Facilities and aircraft ==
Franklin Municipal Airport covers an area of 313 acres (127 ha) at an elevation of 41 feet (12 m) above mean sea level. It has one runway designated 9/27 with a 4,977 x 100 ft (1,517 x 30 m) asphalt surface. Two former runways, 14/32 and 4/22, are in no longer used and marked with yellow X's.

For the 12-month period ending March 31, 2007, the airport had 5,012 aircraft operations, an average of 13 per day: 70% general aviation, 30% military and <1% air taxi. At that time there were 25 aircraft based at this airport: 84% single-engine, 12% multi-engine and 4% ultralight.
