= Southern Literary Journal =

Academic journal (1968–2018)

- Discipline: Southern literature
- Language: English
- Edited by: Sharon P. Holland

Publication details
- History: 1968–2018
- Publisher: University of North Carolina Press for the Dept. of English, University of North Carolina at Chapel Hill (USA)
- Frequency: Biannual

Standard abbreviations
- ISO 4: South. Lit. J.

Indexing
- ISSN: 0038-4291 (print); 1534-1461 (web)

Links
- Journal homepage

Southern Literary Journal (SLJ), later south, was an academic literary journal established in 1968 by editors Louis D. Rubin, Jr. and C. Hugh Holman. In 2015 the journal changed focus from literary to interdisciplinary content and changed its name to south. It ceased publication in fall 2018. It was published by the University of North Carolina Press biannually.
