= Louis D. Rubin Jr. =

American literary critic and academic (1923–2013)

- Born: November 19, 1923; Charleston, South Carolina, U.S.
- Died: November 16, 2013 (aged 89)
- Occupations: Literary critic, writer, teacher, and publisher
- Spouse: Eva Redfield (m. 1951)

Academic background
- Education: University of Richmond (BA 1946); Johns Hopkins University (MA 1949; PhD 1954)

Academic work
- Discipline: Literature
- Sub-discipline: Southern United States literature
- Institutions: Hollins College (1957–1967); University of North Carolina at Chapel Hill (1967–1989)

Louis Decimus Rubin Jr. (November 19, 1923 – November 16, 2013) was a noted American literary critic, writer, teacher, and publisher. He is credited with helping to establish Southern literature as a recognized area of study within the field of American literature, as well as serving as a teacher and mentor for writers at Hollins College and the University of North Carolina at Chapel Hill; and for founding Algonquin Books of Chapel Hill, a publishing company nationally recognized for fiction by Southern writers.

== Early life and education ==
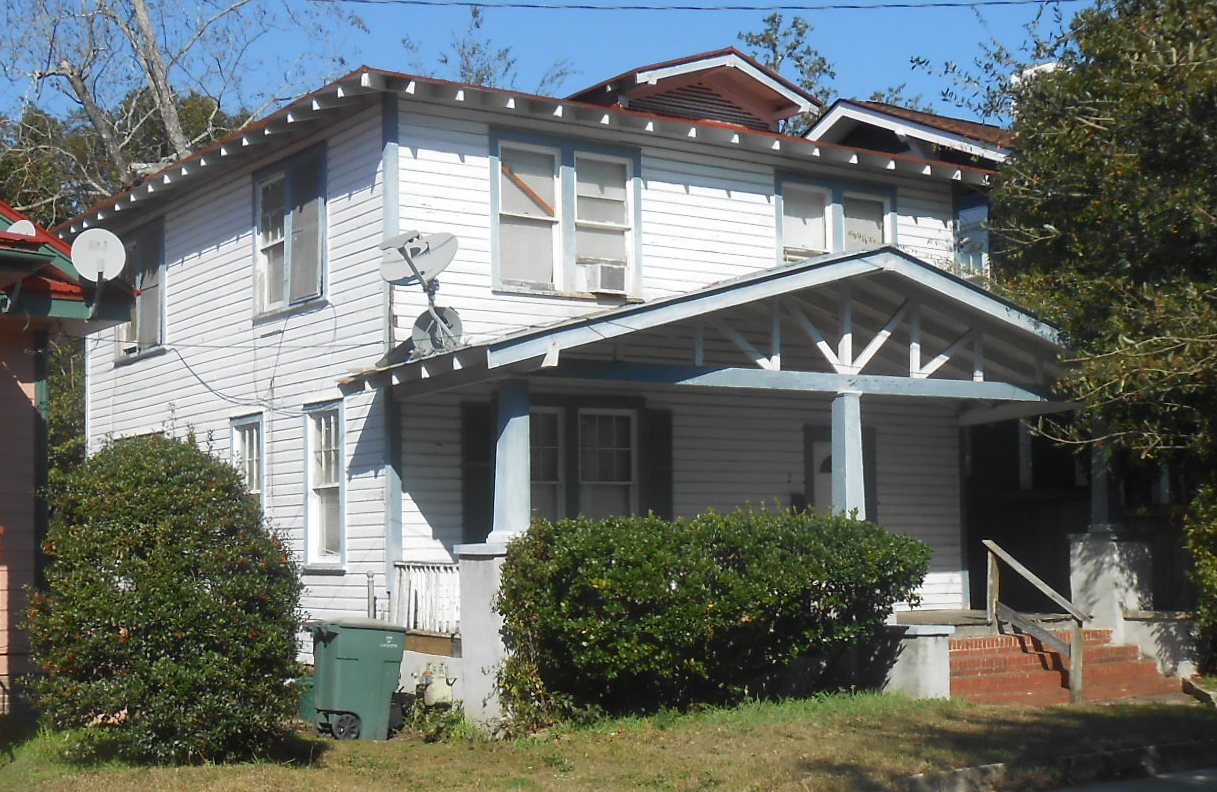
The Rubins lived at 2 North Allan Park, Charleston, South Carolina during the 1920s.

=== Childhood ===
Louis D. Rubin Jr. was born in Charleston, South Carolina, the eldest of the three children of Louis D. Rubin Sr. and Jeanette Weinstein Rubin. His father, who later became well known in Virginia as an amateur weather forecaster and published a book on weather forecasting, owned an electrical supply business.

Rubin's childhood in Charleston and experience as a Jew growing up in the American South were among subjects he explored in three novels and a series of nonfiction memoirs. The city had been economically and culturally stagnant since the end of the American Civil War in 1865, but in the 1920s and 1930s it saw a growing tourist industry and the stirrings of economic modernization that brought the contrasts between Charleston's insularity and modern America to his attention.

=== Military service, journalism, and literary criticism ===
Rubin studied for two years at the College of Charleston, then was drafted into the U.S. Army during World War II; he studied Italian at Yale University as part of the Army Specialized Training Program, then worked as a journalist for the base newspaper at Fort Benning. After the war he received a B.A. from the University of Richmond in 1946, and an M.A. and Ph.D from the Johns Hopkins University in 1949 and 1954, respectively.

Rubin's early ambition was to be a journalist. In his memoir, An Honorable Estate: My Time in the Working Press, Rubin describes a career that began with covering local news and sports for several Charleston newspapers and at the US Army paper at Fort Benning during the war, then continued after the war with stints as a reporter, editor, and rewrite man for papers in Hackensack, New Jersey and Staunton, Virginia, and with the Associated Press in Richmond, Virginia. Having grown frustrated with the lack of creativity at his rewrite job with the Associated Press, he took advantage of GI Bill benefits to enroll in 1948 in the Department of Writing, Speech and Drama (later the Writing Seminars) at Johns Hopkins University.

In his years at Hopkins, a period during which he married Eva Redfield in 1951 and worked part-time as a newspaper copy editor, Rubin studied under poet Elliott Coleman and historian C. Vann Woodward, served as editor of The Hopkins Review, and taught creative writing (an early student was novelist John Barth). A Hopkins Review symposium led to the 1953 book that he co-edited (with Robert D. Jacobs), Southern Renascence: The Literature of the Modern South, which focused on the literature of the Southern Renaissance and helped define the canon of modern southern writers that included the Southern Agrarians, William Faulkner, Eudora Welty, and others. After receiving a Ph.D in an interdepartmental program in aesthetics and literary theory, he served as Executive Secretary for the American Studies Association from 1954–1956, and taught at the University of Pennsylvania.

In 1956 and 1957 Rubin briefly returned to journalism as an editorial writer for the Richmond News Leader, which was ardent in its support of Virginia's segregationist policy of Massive Resistance. His own liberal political views were marginalized by the editorial page's editor, James J. Kilpatrick, who assigned him only non-political topics. Literary scholar Fred Hobson has argued that Rubin's frustration with the paper's racial politics converted him from an idyllic to a more critical attitude regarding the treatment of race by Southern literary writers, and informed his later scholarly work.

== Career ==
=== Years at Hollins College and UNC–Chapel Hill ===
Rubin joined the faculty at Hollins College (now Hollins University) in 1957, soon becoming a full professor and chairman of the Department of English. He brought noted authors such as Eudora Welty, Howard Nemerov and William Golding to campus as writers-in-residence, founded the Hollins Critic literary journal, and in 1960 established a co-ed graduate-level creative writing program at the women's college. Rubin's tenure at Hollins (1957–67) coincided with societal changes that saw women from the school aspiring to make a mark professionally in the arts, the sciences, and in business. He served as mentor and writing teacher to many of them, including novelists Lee Smith, Elizabeth Forsythe Hailey, Annie Dillard, and Sylvia Wilkinson; poets Jane Gentry Vance and Elizabeth Seydel Morgan; literary editor Shannon Ravenel; literary critics Anne Goodwyn Jones and Lucinda MacKethan; and many more. During this period he also published a number of influential critical studies, including The Faraway Country: Writers of the Modern South (1963), and founded the Southern Literary Studies series at Louisiana State University Press.

Rubin moved to Chapel Hill, North Carolina in 1967 to join the faculty of the Department of English at the University of North Carolina at Chapel Hill (UNC-Chapel Hill) as professor, and later was named to the University Distinguished Professor chair there. He continued to be a leading voice in the study of the American South, co-founding the Southern Literary Journal with C. Hugh Holman and co-founding the Society for the Study of Southern Literature as well. His publications included major bibliographic, historical, and critical volumes, including A Bibliographical Guide to the Study of Southern Literature (1969) and The History of Southern Literature (1985) that solidified the field of study that his first book had helped to establish. Many of Rubin's students at UNC-Chapel Hill went on to become noted scholars in their own right, and he continued to teach courses in creative writing and English to future novelists including Jill McCorkle and Kaye Gibbons. He also helped establish the careers of many literary scholars, among them Joseph M. Flora, Fred Hobson, and MaryAnn Wimsatt. He retired from teaching in 1989.

=== Algonquin Books of Chapel Hill ===
In 1982, Rubin and his former student, Shannon Ravenel, co-founded Algonquin Books of Chapel Hill, an independent literary publishing company. The company's editorial offices were initially in Rubin's garage in Chapel Hill and Ravenel's home in St. Louis. Despite shaky finances, the company successfully introduced a number of new writers, most of whom were Southern fiction writers; these included Rubin's former students Jill McCorkle and Kaye Gibbons, as well as Clyde Edgerton, Dori Sanders, and Larry Brown. The company was acquired in 1989 by Workman Publishing and has gone on to publish a number of best-selling books. Rubin stayed on for two years as its chief editor and publisher, then retired from publishing in 1991, though he continued to edit some books for Algonquin. He was given the Ivan Sandrof Lifetime Achievement Award by the National Book Critics Circle in 2004 for his work at Algonquin and as a writing teacher. He was named to the North Carolina Literary Hall of Fame in 1997.

== Notable works ==
=== Literary history and criticism ===
- Southern Renascence: The Literature of the Modern South (coedited with Robert D. Jacobs, 1953)
- Thomas Wolfe: The Weather of His Youth (1955)
- No Place on Earth: Ellen Glasgow, James Branch Cabell, and Richmond-in-Virginia (1959)
- The Faraway Country: Writers of the Modern South (1963)
- The Curious Death of the Novel: Essays in American Literature (1967)
- The Teller in the Tale (1967)
- George W. Cable: The Life and Times of a Southern Heretic (1969)
- A Bibliographical Guide to the Study of Southern Literature (editor, 1969)
- The Writer in the South (1972)
- Black Poetry in America: Two Essays in Interpretation (1974)
- William Elliott Shoots a Bear: Essays on the Southern Literary Imagination (1976)
- The Wary Fugitives: Four Poets and the South (1978)
- The American South: Portrait of a Culture (editor, 1980)
- A Gallery of Southerners (1982)
- The History of Southern Literature (editor, 1985)
- The Edge of the Swamp: A Study in the Literature and Society of the Old South (1989)
- The Mockingbird in the Gum Tree: A Literary Gallimaufry (1991)
- Babe Ruth's Ghost: And Other Historical and Literary Speculations (1996)
- Where the Southern Cross the Yellow Dog: On Writers and Writing (2005)

=== History, memoir, and short fiction ===
- Virginia: A Bicentennial History (1977)
- The Boll Weevil and the Triple Play (1979)
- Before the Game (1988)
- Small Craft Advisory: A Book about the Building of a Boat (1991)
- Seaports of the South: A Journey (1998)
- A Memory of Trains: The Boll Weevil and Others (2000)
- An Honorable Estate: My Time in the Working Press (2001)
- My Father's People: A Family of Southern Jews (2002)
- The Summer the Archduke Died: On Wars and Warriors (2008)
- Uptown and Downtown in Old Charleston: Sketches and Stories (2010)

=== Anthologies and writing instruction ===
- The Literary South (1979)
- The Algonquin Literary Quiz Book (with Julia Randall and Jerry Leith Mills, 1990)
- A Writer's Companion (with Jerry Leith Mills, 1995)

=== Novels ===
- The Golden Weather (1961)
- Surfaces of a Diamond (1981)
- The Heat of the Sun (1995)

== See also ==
- Library of Virginia
- Fellowship of Southern Writers
- List of Guggenheim Fellowships Awarded in 1957
- North Carolina Award
- Sam Ragan Awards
