= The Elms (Franklin, Virginia) =

Historic house in Virginia, United States

- U.S. National Register of Historic Places
- Virginia Landmarks Register
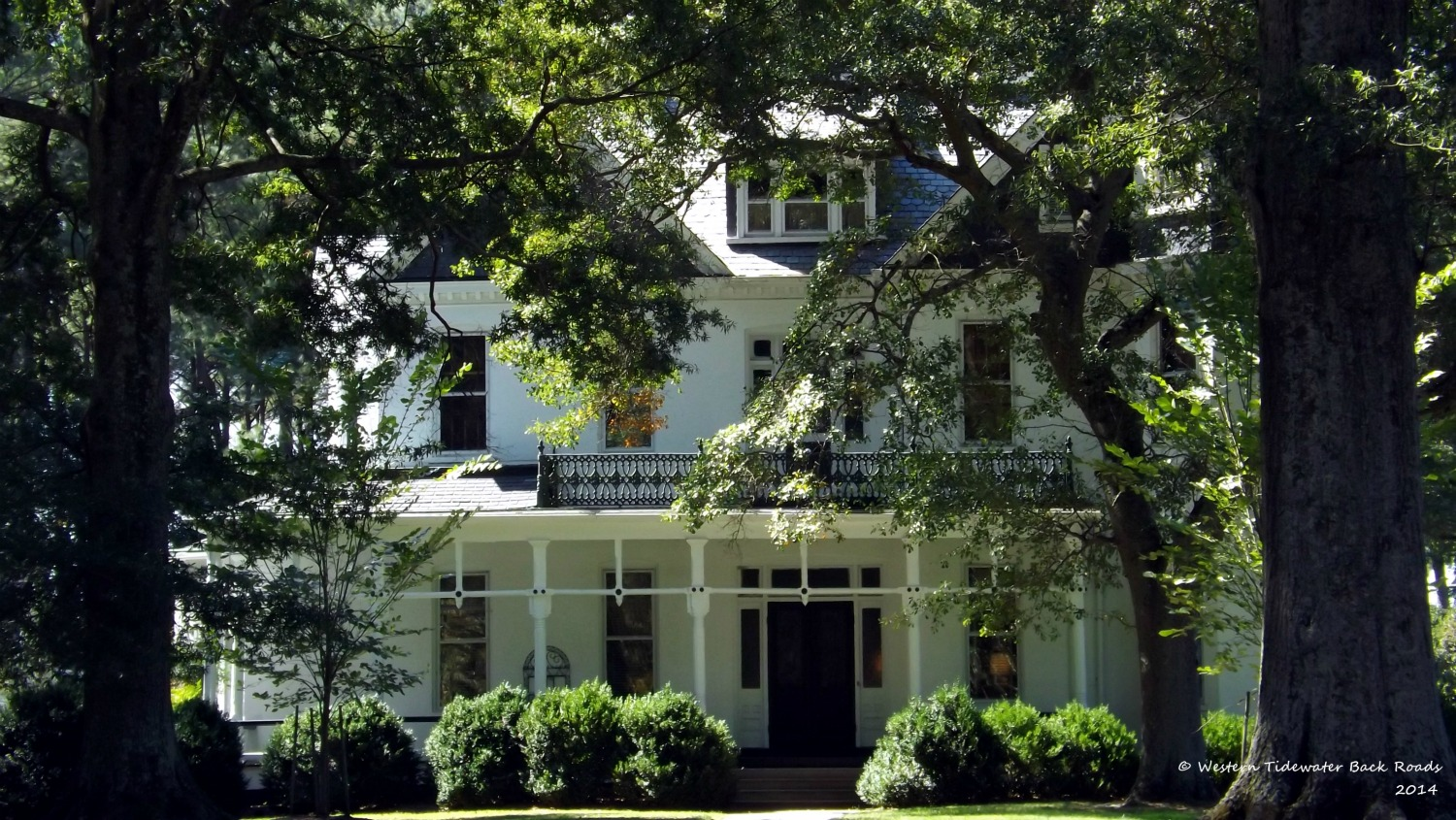

- Location within Virginia Location within the United States
- Location: Clay St., Franklin, Virginia
- Coordinates: 36°40′45″N 76°56′01″W
- Area: 11 acres (4.5 ha)
- Built: 1898
- Architectural style: Colonial Revival, Queen Anne
- NRHP reference No.: 82004556
- VLR No.: 145-0005

Significant dates
- Added to NRHP: September 9, 1982
- Designated VLR: September 15, 1981

The Elms, also known as the P. D. Camp House, is a historic home located at Franklin, Virginia. It was built in 1898, as a 2 1/2-story, stuccoed brick eclectic dwelling with features of the Queen Anne and Colonial Revival styles. It has a rear brick ell. It consists of a hipped roof central block flanked by a pedimented gable end and a three-story turret with a conical roof. The roof is topped with original decorative iron cresting and the house has a one-story porch. The house was built by Paul D. Camp, founder of the Camp Manufacturing Company, and later the Union Camp Corporation.

It was listed on the National Register of Historic Places in 1982.
