= Alan McCullough (architect) =

American architect (died 1993)

Alan McCullough Jr.
- Born: Norfolk, Virginia, U.S.
- Died: July 11, 1993 (aged 84); Richmond, Virginia, U.S.
- Occupation: Architect
- Spouse: Mary Winston White (m. 1938)
- Children: 4

Alan McCullough Jr. (died July 11, 1993) was a 20th-century modernist architect who found popularity after World War II for his Virginia residences.

== Biography ==
Alan McCullough Jr. was born in Norfolk, Virginia, to Frank Wheatley McCullough. He was commissioned as a second lieutenant of the Marine Corps in World War II. He attained the rank of major by war end. He served with Marine Air Group 33 in the Pacific theater and in the Battle of Okinawa. His work in Richmond, Norfolk and the Northern Neck married modern design and planning with local elements like colonial brick and buff-colored mortar. Like other regional architects such as Virginia Beach's Lewis Rightmier, Richmond's E. Tucker Carlton and Alexandria's Charles M. Goodman, McCullough took the open plans, striking geometry and low profiles of houses by Frank Lloyd Wright and built houses with regional elements appropriate to Virginia's climate and history. McCullough's trademark features includes terrazzo floors and raised fireplaces with levitating hearths. Notable schools by McCullough include Richmond's Collegiate School and the annex to Richmond's Blackwell School. McCullough also designed buildings for C&P Telephone, United Virginia Bank and The Tides Inn. McCullough retired in 1972 to Lancaster County, Virginia in the Northern Neck, and continued to work.

McCullough married Mary Winston White, daughter of Thomas N. White, of Franklin, Virginia, on June 18, 1938. They had two sons and two daughters, Frank, Alan Jr., Jane and Lucy. He died on July 11, 1993, aged 84, in a Richmond hospital.

McCullough's father named the Virginia Beach, Virginia subdivision Alanton after him.
