= C. Hugh Holman =

American scholar, administrator and novelist (1914–1981)

- Born: Clarence Hugh Holman; February 24, 1914; Cross Anchor, South Carolina, U.S.
- Died: October 14, 1981 (aged 67)
- Resting place: Chapel Hill Memorial Cemetery
- Education: Presbyterian College (BS 1936; BA 1939); University of North Carolina Chapel Hill (PhD 1949)
- Occupation: Literary scholar
- Spouse: Verna Virginia McCleod
- Children: 1 son, 1 daughter
- Parent(s): David Marion; Jessie Pearl Davis Holman

Clarence Hugh Holman (February 24, 1914 – October 14, 1981) was an American literary scholar, academic administrator and detective novelist. He was a Professor of English at the University of North Carolina Chapel Hill and its Provost from 1966 to 1968. He was the vice president of the National Humanities Center. He was the author of many books about Southern literature and the founding co-editor of the Southern Literary Journal. He was the recipient of several awards.

== Early life ==
Clarence Hugh Holman was born on February 24, 1914, in Cross Anchor, Spartanburg County, South Carolina. He was educated in Gaffney and Clinton.

Holman graduated with a bachelor of science in chemistry from Presbyterian College in 1936. He subsequently earned a bachelor of arts from the same institution in 1939. He enrolled at the University of North Carolina at Chapel Hill in 1946, and he earned a PhD in American Literature in 1949. His thesis was about the historical fiction of William Gilmore Simms.

== Academic career ==
Holman started his career at his alma mater, Presbyterian College, where he was director of public relations from 1939 to 1941, and director of radio as well as English instructor in 1941. He served as its academic dean for the Council of National Defense from 1942 to 1944. He was a professor of physics for the United States Army Air Forces from 1943 to 1945.

Holman became an assistant professor of English at the University of North Carolina Chapel Hill in 1949. He gained tenure as he became an associate professor in 1951, he was promoted to full professor in 1956. He was awarded an endowed chair as Kenan Professor in 1959. He was the chair of the Department of English from 1957 to 1962. He published research about William Gilmore Simms, Thomas Wolfe, William Faulkner, Ellen Glasgow. He authored or co-authored several books of literary scholarship.

Holman was also a university administrator at UNC, as he was assistant dean in 1954 and acting dean of the College of Arts and Sciences from 1955 to 1957. He was the dean of the graduate school from 1963 to 1966, provost from 1966 to 1968, and special assistant to the chancellor, Ferebee Taylor, from 1972 to 1978.

Holman was a member of the board of governors of the University of North Carolina Press from 1957 to 1973, and its chairman from 1961 to 1973. He was the vice president of the National Humanities Center. He was also the chairman of the American Literature Section of the Modern Language Association in 1970. He was the founding co-editor of the Southern Literary Journal alongside Louis D. Rubin Jr.

Holman was the recipient of a Guggenheim Fellowship in 1967, the Thomas Jefferson Award in 1975, an award for excellence in writing from Winthrop College in 1976, and the O. Max Gardner Award from UNC in 1977. He received an honorary doctorate from his alma mater, Presbyterian College, in 1973. He also won the Mayflower Award for The Loneliness at the Core : Studies in Thomas Wolfe in 1975.

== Detective novelist ==
Holman authored six detective novels in the 1940s-1950s, two of which were campus novels based on his experience at Presbyterian College. Five of his novels feature Sheriff Macready, the sheriff of fictional Hart County, South Carolina.

His first novel, Death Like Thunder, is a campus novel at Abeton College, modelled after Presbyterian College. It tells the story of Michael Leister, a radio programmer from New York City who is wrongly accused of murdering a faculty member.

His second novel, Trout in the Milk, is about the murder of William T. Sirdar, the owner of a cotton mill, in his mansion. In this novel, a radio script-writer, also from New York City, works alongside the sheriff to resolve the murder.

His next novel, Slay the Murderer, is about the murder of a scion to the Deahl family; again, a visitor is suspected of guilt by the community, but the sheriff thinks not.

In his next novel, Up This Crooked Way, another campus novel at Aberton College, is about the murder of Walter G. Parkins and the acquittal of Dr Philip Kent, a Professor of English who nevertheless remains guilty in the minds of the community members.

In Another Man's Poison, Sheriff Macready visits the fictional town of Houghton, based on Spartanburg, South Carolina, where he solves the murder of Charles Borden Champion, a congressman and champion of white supremacy.

Holman wrote his last detective novel under the pseudonym of Clarence Hunt. Called Small Town Corpse, it is about sheriff John McNarly's investigation into a murder disguised as a suicide.

== Personal life, death and legacy ==
Holman married Verna Virginia McCleod. They had a son and a daughter. Holman was a deacon of the First Presbyterian Church in Clinton and an elder of the Trinity Avenue Presbyterian Church in Durham.

Holman died on October 14, 1981, at the age of 67. He was buried in the Chapel Hill Memorial Cemetery.

In December 1985, the Society for the Study of Southern Literature established the eponymous C. Hugh Holman Award, with the intent to honor a scholarly book about Southern Literature every year.

== Works ==
=== Detective novels ===
- Holman, C. Hugh (1942). Death like Thunder.
- Holman, C. Hugh (1946). Trout in the Milk.
- Holman, C. Hugh (1946). Up This Crooked Way.
- Holman, C. Hugh (1947). Another Man's Poison.
- Hunt, Clarence (1951). Small Town Corpse.

=== Literary scholarship ===
- Holman, C. Hugh; Thrall, William Flint (1960). A Handbook to Literature. New York: Odyssey Press. OCLC 959755224.
- Holman, C. Hugh (1960). Thomas Wolfe. Minneapolis: University of Minnesota Press. OCLC 974192504.
- Holman, C. Hugh (1962). The Thomas Wolfe Reader. New York: Charles Scribner's. OCLC 796896836.
- Holman, C. Hugh (1966). Three Modes of Modern Southern Fiction: Ellen Glasgow, William Faulkner, Thomas Wolfe. Athens, Georgia: University of Georgia Press. OCLC 859825215.
- Holman, C. Hugh; Ross, Sue Fields (1968). The Letters of Thomas Wolfe. Chapel Hill, North Carolina: University of North Carolina Chapel Hill Press. OCLC 257949485.
- Holman, C. Hugh; Rubin, Louis D. Jr.; Sullivan, Walter (1969). Southern Fiction: Renaissance and Beyond. Athens, Georgia: University of Georgia Press. OCLC 489993640.
- Davis, Richard Beale; Holman, C. Hugh; Rubin, Louis D. Jr. (1970). Southern Writing, 1585-1920. New York: Odyssey Press. OCLC 907422022.
- Holman, C. Hugh (1972). The Roots of Southern Writing. Athens, Georgia: University of Georgia Press. ISBN 9780820302904. OCLC 468393193.
- Holman, C. Hugh (1975). The Loneliness and the Core: Studies in Thomas Wolfe. Baton Rouge, Louisiana: Louisiana State University Press. ISBN 9780807100851. OCLC 469892061.
- Holman, C. Hugh; Rubin, Louis D. Jr. (1975). Southern Literary Study: Promise and Possibilities. University of North Carolina Press. ISBN 9780807812525.
- Holman, C. Hugh (1977). The Immoderate Past: The Southern Writer and History. University of Georgia Press. ISBN 9780820304199.
- Holman, C. Hugh (1979). Windows on the World: Essays on American Social Fiction. ISBN 9780870492648.
