= Hayden High School (Franklin, Virginia) =

- U.S. National Register of Historic Places
- Virginia Landmarks Register
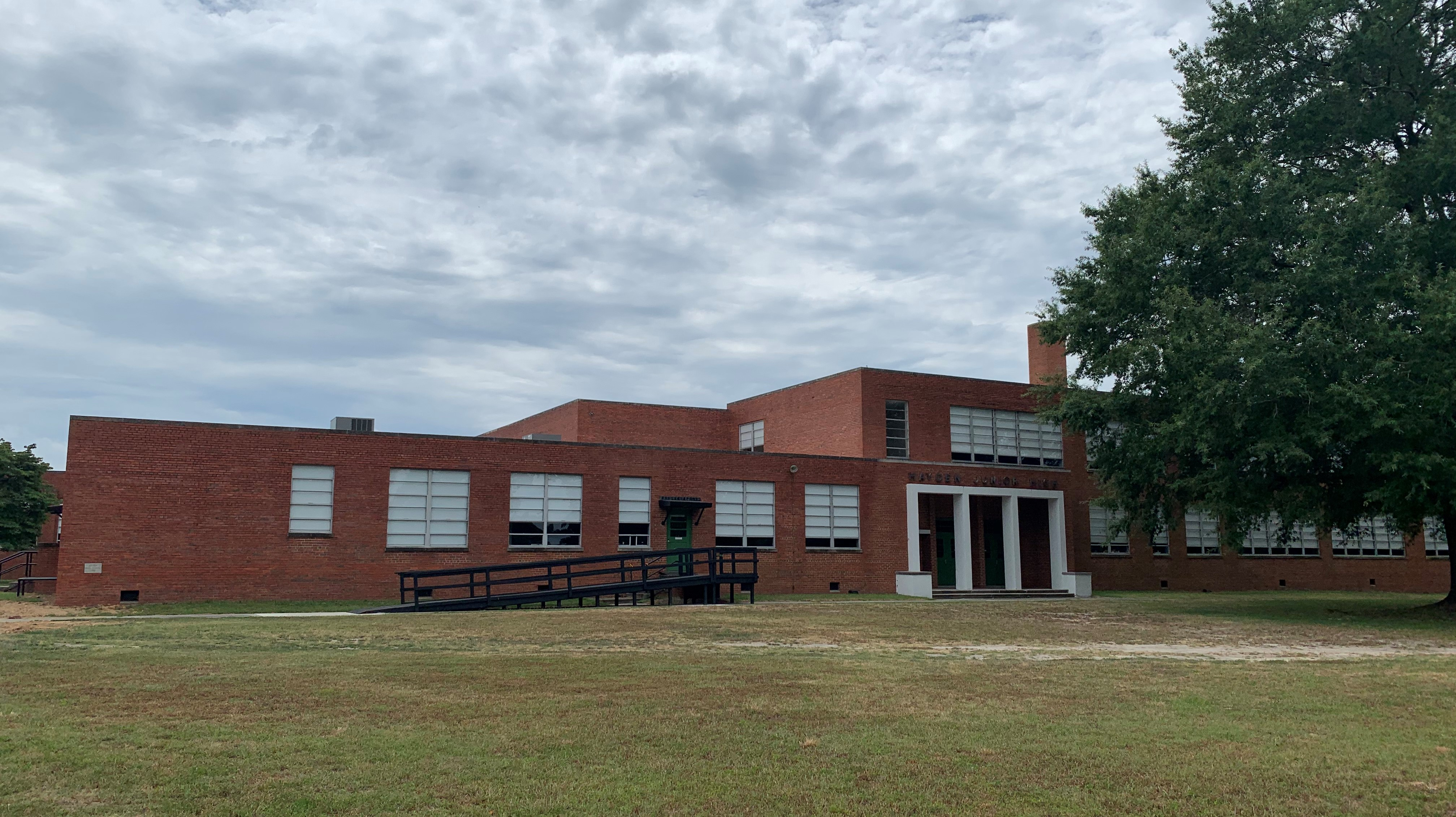
- Hayden High School in Franklin, Virginia, July 2020

- Location within Virginia Location within the United States
- Location: 610-678 Oak St., Franklin, Virginia
- Coordinates: 36°40′04″N 76°55′36″W
- Area: 5.873 acres (2.377 ha)
- Built: 1952-1953, 1969
- Built by: Silas S. Kea & Sons
- Architect: Dixon, Washington Irving (W. I.)
- NRHP reference No.: 12001268
- VLR No.: 145-5012

Significant dates
- Added to NRHP: February 5, 2013
- Designated VLR: December 13, 2012

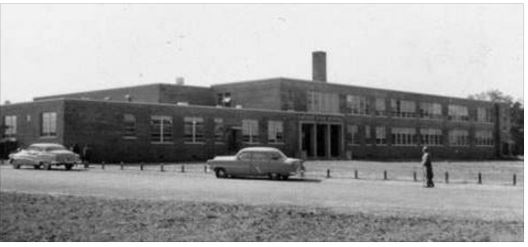
Hayden High during the 1950s

Hayden High School is a historic high school complex for African-American students located in Franklin, Virginia. The main building was completed in 1953 and is a two-story, "L"-plan brick-clad building with two smaller one-story additions. Associated with the main school are two 1969 one-story classroom buildings situated behind the school. Hayden High School is an important site in the fight over both equalization and desegregation of public schools. The school was closed in the 1980s, after housing a middle school.

The school was named for educator Della Irving Hayden (1851-1924), founder of the Franklin Normal and Industrial Institute. It was added to the National Register of Historic Places in 2013.
