= Robert D. Jacobs =

American academic (??–1998)

Robert Durene Jacobs Jr. (died October 28, 1998) was an American academic who specialised in the literature of the Southern United States.

Originally from Mississippi, Jacobs served in the United States Marine Corps during World War II, before returning to the United States and becoming a university lecturer. He published works on topics including the Southern Renaissance and Edgar Allan Poe.

== Early life and education ==
Jacobs was a native of Bovina, Mississippi. His father was Robert Durene Jacobs.

Jacobs first attended Louisiana State University, before graduating from the University of Mississippi in 1937. He received an MA from the University of Mississippi in 1938.

=== Military service and doctorate study ===
In January 1941, Jacobs enlisted in the United States Marine Corps. Within the next year, he completed training at MCB Quantico to become an officer and was commissioned second lieutenant. He was then promoted to the rank of Captain. From August 1942, he took part in the Guadalcanal campaign of World War II, engaging in battles at Lunga Point and the Matanikau River.

By June 1945, he held the rank of Major. That month, he was announced as a tutor for the Officers' Refresher Course at the Field Artillery School.

Jacobs later graduated from Johns Hopkins University with a PhD in English. While there, he taught the fiction writer John Barth in an undergraduate creative writing class.

== Academic career ==
In 1953, Jacobs began working at the University of Kentucky as an instructor in English, speech and dramatic arts.

He then joined Georgia State University in the 1970s, retiring as Callaway Chair professor of American literature in the 1980s.

== Writing career ==
In the 1950s, Jacobs co-edited a collections of essays with Louis D. Rubin Jr. titled Southern Renascence: The Literature of the Modern South. The pair edited another collection of essays in 1961, titled South: Modern South Literature in its Cultural Setting.

In 1969, he published Poe: Critic and Journalist.

== Personal life ==
Jacobs lived in Dunwoody, Georgia. In September 1945, he announced his engagement to Mildred Page Simons. They had a daughter called Bonnie Page Jacobs.

Jacobs's health deteriorated in his later years: he walked with a cane and suffered from memory problems. In October 1998, he disappeared while running errands and was found dead eight days later on October 28, having crashed his car into some trees near Douglasville, Georgia. He was 80 years old at the time of his death.

== Externals links ==
- Robert D. Jacobs at Find a Grave
