= William B. Lindsey =

American politician

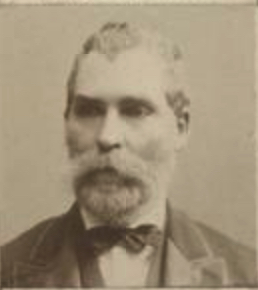

Member of the Virginia House of Delegates from Carroll County
- In office December 2, 1891 – December 6, 1893
- Preceded by: David W. Bolen
- Succeeded by: S. E. Wilkinson

Personal details
- Born: William Benjamin Lindsey; January 8, 1842 Franklin, Virginia, U.S.
- Died: January 8, 1929 (aged 87) Carroll, Virginia, U.S.
- Party: Democratic

William Benjamin Lindsey (January 8, 1842 – January 8, 1929) was an American politician who served in the Virginia House of Delegates.
