= Franklin, Virginia =

Independent city in Virginia, United States

- Independent city
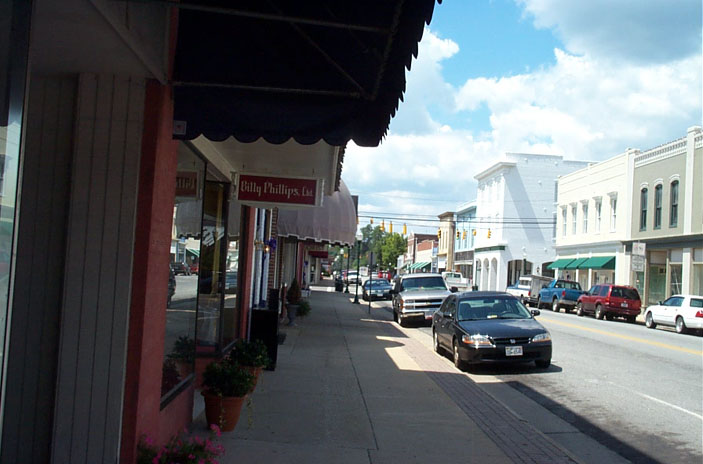
- Downtown Franklin, Virginia

- Seal
- Motto: "Growth – Community – Spirit"
- Location in the Commonwealth of Virginia
- Coordinates: 36°40′38″N 76°55′20″W
- Country: United States
- State: Virginia
- County: None (Independent city)
- Incorporated (Town): March 1876
- Incorporated (City): 1961

Government
  - Mayor: Paul Kaplan
  - Vice Mayor: Wynndolyn H. Copeland

Area
  - Total: 8.37 sq mi (21.67 km^{2})
  - Land: 8.28 sq mi (21.44 km^{2})
  - Water: 0.089 sq mi (0.23 km^{2})
- Elevation: 39 ft (12 m)

Population (2020)
  - Total: 8,180
  - Estimate (2025): 8,478 ▲
  - Density: 988/sq mi (382/km^{2})
- Time zone: UTC-5 (EST)
  - Summer (DST): UTC-4 (EDT)
- ZIP code: 23851
- Area codes: 757, 948
- FIPS code: 51-29600
- GNIS feature ID: 1494943
- Website: franklinva.gov

Franklin is an independent city in the Commonwealth of Virginia. As of the 2020 census, the population was 8,180. The Bureau of Economic Analysis combines the city of Franklin with Southampton County for statistical purposes.

== History ==
The city of Franklin had its beginnings in the 1830s as a railroad stop along the Blackwater River. During this era, the river was used to transport goods to and from Albemarle Sound in North Carolina.

=== Civil War ===
In 1862, the Civil War came to Franklin in what was referred to as the Joint Expedition against Franklin. As several U.S. Navy flag steamships, led by the USS Commodore Perry, tried to pass through Franklin on the Blackwater River, a band of local Confederates opened fire on the ships. As stated by an officer aboard one of the ships, "The fighting was the same— Here and there high banks with dense foliage, a narrow and very crooked stream, with the frequent heavy firing of musketry." During the battle, five were killed in action and sixteen were wounded. As the naval vessels retreated, the Confederates tried to block the narrow Blackwater River by felling large trees across it. In the end, the Confederate attempts failed, as no soldiers were captured and no ships were lost. A total of seven Medals of Honor were awarded to individual seamen for their distinguished service.

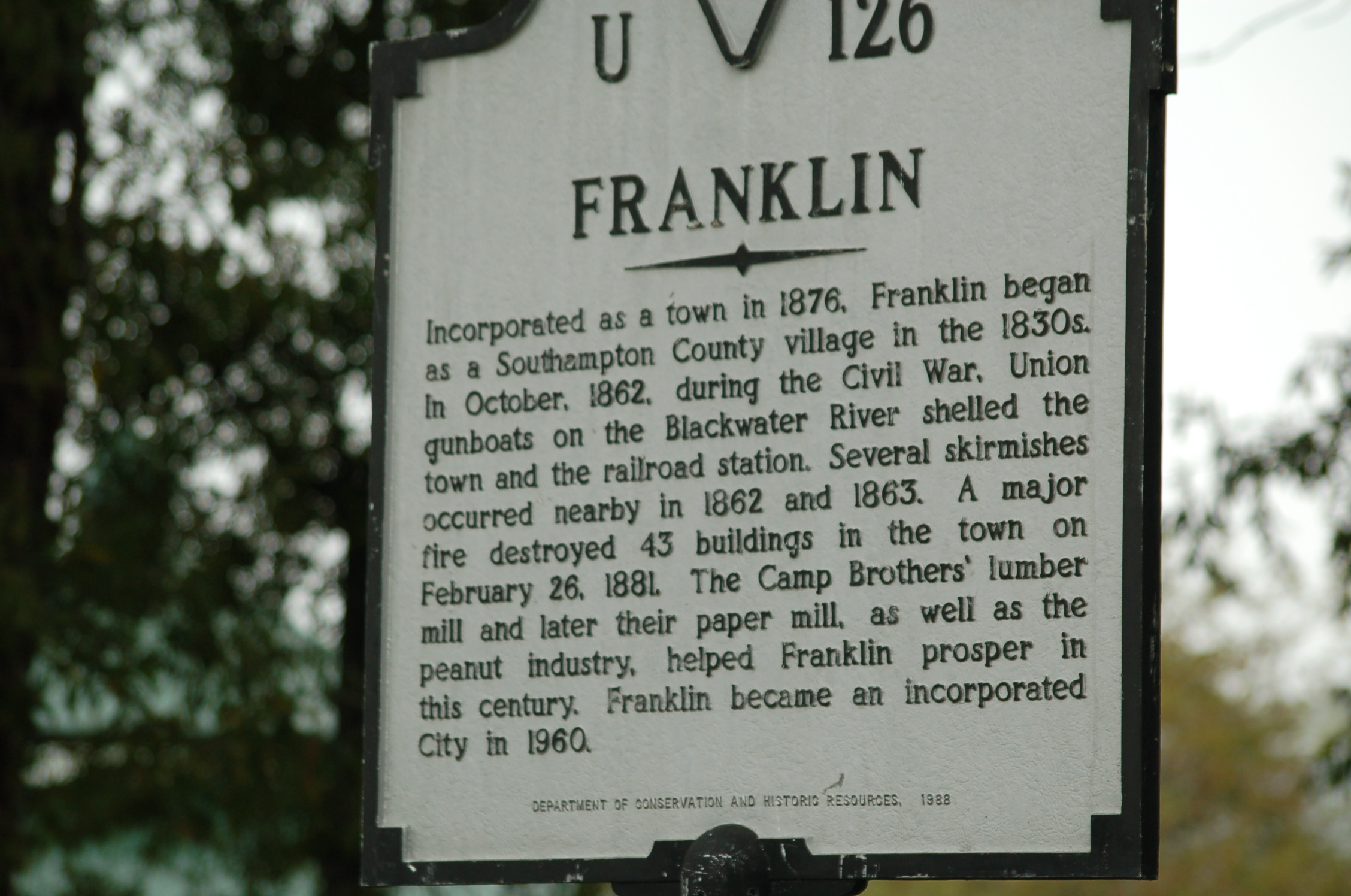
A historic sign in downtown Franklin with information on the Civil War and Union Camp

=== Industrialization and the Camp family ===
It was not until 1887 that Franklin began to see significant growth. Six brothers from the Camp family, with local roots, took possession of a local sawmill. The sawmill was small and had been operating for several years alongside the Blackwater River. With the Camp family's acquisition of the mill, it experienced 20 years of rapid growth under the leadership of Paul Douglas Camp (president), James Leonidas Camp (vice-president), and Robert Judson Camp (secretary-treasurer). Franklin became a stop on the Atlantic and Danville Railway in 1890. At the end of this period, after a bout with near-bankruptcy, World War I brought the Camp family back to financial success, bringing along with it the city of Franklin. By 1918, "Tiny Franklin had become a booming wartime village..."

By 1955, the Camp Corporation's annual sales reached $28 million, much of which spread throughout the city of Franklin. The Camp family, with a strong sense of family and community, gave much back to the city of Franklin through above-average wages and generous donations to local causes. On May 29, 1956, the residents of Franklin were informed that the Local Camp Manufacturing Corporation had just negotiated a merger with the Union Bag and Paper company operating out of New York. This merger formed the Union Camp Corporation.

The city continued to grow along with Union Camp and was incorporated as an independent city in 1961, separating from Southampton County.

Union Camp thrived in Franklin until 1999, when it was acquired by International Paper. Though Union Camp no longer exists in Franklin, the Camp family name lives on. Their legacy is most notable in the community, with Paul D. Camp Community College, the James L Camp Jr. YMCA, the Texie Camp Marks Children's Center, and the Ruth Camp Campbell Memorial Library.

== Geography ==
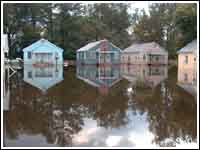
Flooding in Franklin after Hurricane Floyd

Flood level marker in downtown Franklin

Franklin is located in southeastern Virginia at 36°40′38″N 76°55′20″W (36.6772, -76.9222). Its eastern border is the Blackwater River, a south-flowing tributary of the Chowan River, the principal inflow for Albemarle Sound in North Carolina. U.S. Route 58 (Southampton Parkway) follows the southern border of the city, leading east 21 miles (34 km) to Suffolk and 42 mi (68 km) to Norfolk. To the west US 58 leads 35 mi (56 km) to Emporia. U.S. Route 258 passes through the center of Franklin as East Second Avenue, South Main Street, and South Street; US 258 leads northeast 15 mi (24 km) to Windsor, Virginia, and southwest 21 mi (34 km) to Murfreesboro, North Carolina.

According to the United States Census Bureau, the city of Franklin has a total area of 8.3 square miles (21.5 km^{2}), of which 8.2 sq mi (21.2 km^{2}) is land and 0.1 sq mi (0.3 km^{2}) (1.7%) is water. Isle of Wight County is to the north and east, and Southampton County, is to the north, west, and south.

=== Climate ===
The climate in this area is characterized by hot, humid summers and generally mild to cool winters. According to the Köppen Climate Classification system, Franklin has a humid subtropical climate, abbreviated "Cfa" on climate maps.

Climate data for Franklin, VA (1991-2020, coordinates:36.6751°N 76.9235°W)
Month	Jan	Feb	Mar	Apr	May	Jun	Jul	Aug	Sep	Oct	Nov	Dec	Year
Mean daily maximum °F (°C)	50.9 (10.5)	54.1 (12.3)	61.0 (16.1)	71.3 (21.8)	78.6 (25.9)	86.2 (30.1)	89.9 (32.2)	88.0 (31.1)	82.7 (28.2)	73.2 (22.9)	62.9 (17.2)	54.6 (12.6)	71.1 (21.7)
Daily mean °F (°C)	40.4 (4.7)	42.8 (6.0)	49.4 (9.7)	59.3 (15.2)	67.7 (19.8)	75.7 (24.3)	79.7 (26.5)	78.0 (25.6)	72.4 (22.4)	61.6 (16.4)	51.0 (10.6)	43.9 (6.6)	60.2 (15.7)
Mean daily minimum °F (°C)	29.9 (−1.2)	31.5 (−0.3)	37.7 (3.2)	47.4 (8.6)	56.7 (13.7)	65.2 (18.4)	69.5 (20.8)	67.9 (19.9)	62.1 (16.7)	49.9 (9.9)	39.0 (3.9)	33.1 (0.6)	49.2 (9.5)
Average precipitation inches (mm)	3.69 (94)	2.83 (72)	3.97 (101)	3.57 (91)	3.91 (99)	4.61 (117)	5.34 (136)	5.40 (137)	5.45 (138)	4.08 (104)	3.22 (82)	3.58 (91)	49.65 (1,262)
Average dew point °F (°C)	30.7 (−0.7)	31.4 (−0.3)	37.2 (2.9)	46.5 (8.1)	57.1 (13.9)	65.5 (18.6)	69.8 (21.0)	68.9 (20.5)	64.1 (17.8)	52.8 (11.6)	41.9 (5.5)	35.2 (1.8)	50.1 (10.1)
Source: PRISM Climate Group

The Blackwater River, running along the eastern boundary of the city, played an important role in the industrialization of the city but has not been immune to problems plaguing rivers, most notably flooding. In 1999, in the aftermath of Hurricane Floyd, downtown Franklin was submerged under as much as 12 ft (3.7 m) of water as the Blackwater River swelled to a historic crest of 26.4 ft (8.0 m). The resultant flooding caused the submersion of 182 business and 150 homes, located primarily in downtown. When the hurricane name "Floyd" was retired in 2000, the name chosen as a replacement was Franklin. In 2006, Franklin endured another large-scale flood reaching just below the record 23-foot (7.0 m) water line set from the 1999 flood. The flood was the result of a storm that distributed a large amount of water throughout the watershed in which Franklin resides.

== Demographics ==
Historical population
Census	Pop.	Note	%±
1880	477		—
1890	875		83.4%
1900	1,143		30.6%
1910	2,271		98.7%
1920	2,363		4.1%
1930	2,930		24.0%
1940	3,466		18.3%
1950	4,670		34.7%
1960	7,264		55.5%
1970	6,880		−5.3%
1980	7,308		6.2%
1990	7,864		7.6%
2000	8,346		6.1%
2010	8,582		2.8%
2020	8,180		−4.7%
2025 (est.)	8,478	▲	3.6%
U.S. Decennial Census; 1790-1960 1900-1990; 1990-2000 2010-2013

=== Racial and ethnic composition ===
Franklin city, Virginia – Racial and ethnic composition Note: the US Census treats Hispanic/Latino as an ethnic category. This table excludes Latinos from the racial categories and assigns them to a separate category. Hispanics/Latinos may be of any race.
Race / Ethnicity (NH = Non-Hispanic)	Pop 1980	Pop 1990	Pop 2000	Pop 2010	Pop 2020	% 1980	% 1990	% 2000	% 2010	% 2020
White alone (NH)	3,233	3,630	3,800	3,333	2,966	44.24%	46.16%	45.53%	38.84%	36.26%
Black or African American alone (NH)	3,982	4,192	4,351	4,867	4,610	54.49%	53.31%	52.13%	56.71%	56.36%
Native American or Alaska Native alone (NH)	5	6	9	27	25	0.07%	0.08%	0.11%	0.31%	0.31%
Asian alone (NH)	3	20	65	63	81	0.04%	0.25%	0.78%	0.73%	0.99%
Native Hawaiian or Pacific Islander alone (NH)	x	x	1	2	2	x	x	0.01%	0.02%	0.02%
Other race alone (NH)	0	1	8	8	16	0.00%	0.01%	0.10%	0.09%	0.20%
Mixed race or Multiracial (NH)	x	x	66	141	262	x	x	0.79%	1.64%	3.20%
Hispanic or Latino (any race)	85	15	46	141	218	1.16%	0.19%	0.55%	1.64%	2.67%
Total	7,308	7,864	8,346	8,582	8,180	100.00%	100.00%	100.00%	100.00%	100.00%

=== 2020 census ===
As of the 2020 census, Franklin had a population of 8,180. The median age was 43.8 years. 23.1% of residents were under the age of 18 and 21.8% of residents were 65 years of age or older. For every 100 females there were 82.2 males, and for every 100 females age 18 and over there were 75.7 males age 18 and over.

96.1% of residents lived in urban areas, while 3.9% lived in rural areas.

There were 3,407 households in Franklin, of which 29.5% had children under the age of 18 living in them. Of all households, 34.3% were married-couple households, 17.4% were households with a male householder and no spouse or partner present, and 43.2% were households with a female householder and no spouse or partner present. About 32.1% of all households were made up of individuals and 15.6% had someone living alone who was 65 years of age or older.

There were 3,886 housing units, of which 12.3% were vacant. The homeowner vacancy rate was 3.0% and the rental vacancy rate was 12.4%.

Racial composition as of the 2020 census
Race	Number	Percent
White	3,008	36.8%
Black or African American	4,639	56.7%
American Indian and Alaska Native	34	0.4%
Asian	81	1.0%
Native Hawaiian and Other Pacific Islander	5	0.1%
Some other race	79	1.0%
Two or more races	334	4.1%
Hispanic or Latino (of any race)	218	2.7%

=== 2010 census ===
Age distribution in Franklin

As of the census of 2010, there were 8,582 people, 3,384 households, and 2,277 families residing in the city. The population density was 999.2 people per square mile (385.8 people/km^{2}). There were 3,767 housing units at an average density of 451.0 units per square mile (174.1 units/km^{2}). The racial makeup of the city was 56.9% Black or African American, 39.4% White, 0.7% Asian, 0.0% Pacific Islander, 0.7% from other races, 0.3% Native American, and 1.9% from two or more races. 1.6% of the population were Hispanic or Latino of any race.

There were 3,384 households, out of which 30.1% had children under the age of 18 living with them, 41.8% were married couples living together, 21.9% had a female householder with no husband present, and 32.7% were non-families. 28.9% of all households were made up of individuals, and 12.8% had someone living alone who was 65 years of age or older. The average household size was 2.39 and the average family size was 2.93.

In the city, the population was spread out, with 25.1% under the age of 18, 7.7% from 18 to 24, 24.9% from 25 to 44, 23.9% from 45 to 64, and 18.4% who were 65 years of age or older. The median age was 40 years. For every 100 females, there were 79.2 males. For every 100 females aged 18 and over, there were 73.4 males.

The median income for a household in the city was $31,687, and the median income for a family was $40,299. Males had a median income of $32,083 versus $21,927 for females. The per capita income for the city was $18,573. About 16.8% of families and 19.8% of the population were below the poverty line, including 34.9% of those under age 18 and 10.2% of those aged 65 or over.

== Economy ==
Modern Franklin has two major industrial sectors: agriculture and manufacturing. Franklin is listed as being the 13th-most profitable and 12th-largest farming community in the state. The neighboring areas of Southampton and Isle of Wight counties, along with the city of Suffolk, are all ranked in the 20 most profitable farming counties, with Southampton County being the eighth-largest in the state.

With the high agricultural profile of Franklin and the surrounding areas, it was only with the opening of the Camp Lumber Mill in 1887 that the manufacturing sector began to expand. The Camp Lumber Mill became the Union Camp Corporation, which was eventually bought by International Paper. Today, the International Paper mill, located on the eastern boundary of the city, beside the Blackwater River, produces lumber, pulp and paper products and other chemical by-products.

International Paper announced on October 22, 2009, that the paper mill would be permanently closed, which took place in May 2010. This eliminated ~1,100 jobs from the community. They have since resumed limited manufacturing, producing fluff pulp. This resulted in 213 new jobs.

== Arts and culture ==
=== Arts facilities and museums ===
Franklin has a mini-museum of firefighting at the Franklin Fire Department. The Blackwater Regional Library system has the Ruth Camp Campbell Memorial Library.

=== Events and festivals ===
Annual events in Franklin include the Lumberjack Festival and the Juneteenth Cultural Celebration. In the fall, the city hosts the Franklin Fall Festival and the Downtown Boo Bash. There is also the annual Franklin Christmas Parade and the Holiday Open House & Craft Fair.

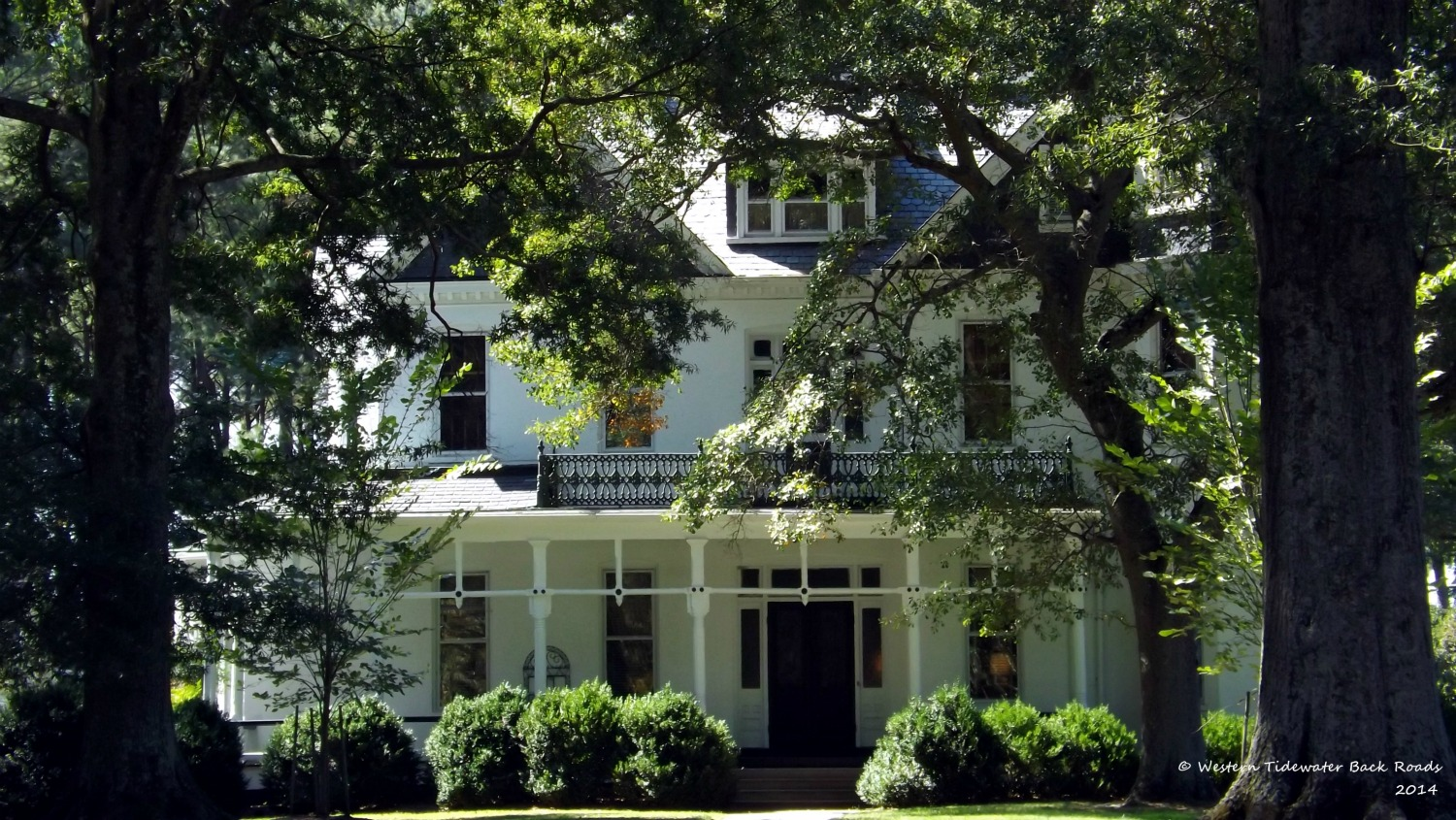
The Elms located on Clay Street

=== Architecture ===
Originally the city's train depot, the restored Franklin Depot & Visitors Center is located in Historic Downtown Franklin. The Elms (Franklin, Virginia) is a Queen Anne and Colonial Revival style house built in 1898; it is listed on the National Register of Historic Places. The seventeen-acre Woods Hills estate is also National Register-listed. The Franklin Historic District includes 226 contributing residential and commercial buildings including the circa 1840 Camp Family Homestead, Pretlow Peanut Company Warehouses, and numerous churches.

== Sports ==
Franklin High School is home to the 2004 and 2008 VHSL Division 1A State Football Champions. Franklin City Schools is home to FIRST Robotics Competition Team 1610 who were winners of the FIRST Robotics NASA/VCU regional robotics competition in 2006 and the FIRST Robotics Virginia regional competition in 2013, 2014, and 2015.

== Parks and recreation ==
The Franklin Department of Parks & Recreation oversees eleven sites, including Barrett's Landing on the Blackwater River, the Blackwater River Boat Landing, and the Nottoway River Boat Landing which include boat ramps for fishing and boating. James L. Camp Jr. YMCA is located in Franklin.

== Government ==
The city has a council–manager government. The city council includes seven members, including one elected from each of six wards and a seventh, the mayor, elected at large.

Franklin is heavily Democratic, having supported Democrats in presidential elections in every election since 1984. Barack Obama won the highest percentage of the vote for any Democrat in the city's history in both 2008 and 2012, and since then every Democratic candidate has gained over 60% of the vote.

United States presidential election results for Franklin, Virginia
Year	Republican		Democratic		Third party(ies)	
Year	No.	%	No.	%	No.	%
1964	783	38.36%	1,257	61.59%	1	0.05%
1968	951	42.15%	792	35.11%	513	22.74%
1972	1,416	64.98%	738	33.87%	25	1.15%
1976	1,127	49.21%	1,116	48.73%	47	2.05%
1980	1,045	42.55%	1,324	53.91%	87	3.54%
1984	1,561	49.87%	1,537	49.11%	32	1.02%
1988	1,557	48.50%	1,630	50.78%	23	0.72%
1992	1,347	40.34%	1,696	50.79%	296	8.86%
1996	1,200	35.45%	1,962	57.96%	223	6.59%
2000	1,393	43.65%	1,763	55.25%	35	1.10%
2004	1,613	45.62%	1,910	54.02%	13	0.37%
2008	1,576	35.60%	2,819	63.68%	32	0.72%
2012	1,496	34.31%	2,833	64.98%	31	0.71%
2016	1,421	34.91%	2,519	61.89%	130	3.19%
2020	1,487	36.64%	2,525	62.22%	46	1.13%
2024	1,476	37.97%	2,359	60.69%	52	1.34%

Both major parties of the United States political system operate in Franklin with official committees.

== Education ==
Franklin City Public Schools includes S. P. Morton Elementary School which includes pre-K through 5, J. P. King, Jr. Middle School which includes grades 6 through 8, and Franklin High School which includes grades 9 through 12. Paul D. Camp Community College is also located in Franklin.

== Infrastructure ==
The Franklin Airport sign

=== Transportation ===
==== Air transit ====
The Franklin Municipal Airport (John Beverly Rose Field) is located in Franklin.

=== Healthcare ===
The Bon Secours - Southampton Medical Center is a 221-bed hospital located in Franklin.

=== Utilities ===
Franklin Municipal Power and Light provide electricity for the city.

== Notable people ==
- Randy Blythe (1971- ), musician Lamb of God (band)
- Terry Bradshaw, professional baseball coach
- James Leonidas Camp, founder and vice-president of Camp Manufacturing Company, later Union Camp Corporation
- Paul Douglas Camp, founder and president of Camp Manufacturing Company, later Union Camp Corporation
- Robert Judson Camp, founder and secretary/treasurer of Camp Manufacturing Company, later Union Camp Corporation
- Paul Councill, politician
- Colgate Darden (1897-1981), politician, University of Virginia president, namesake of Darden School of Business
- Georgia Mabel DeBaptiste, journalist, teacher, and social worker
- Wyatt Durrette, attorney and politician
- Garland Gray, politician
- Lansing Hatfield, bass-baritone opera singer and radio personality
- Della Irving Hayden (1851-1924), founder of the Franklin Normal and Industrial Institute
- Joseph Holland, stage and screen actor
- Mul Holland, professional baseball player
- Richard Hudson, congressman
- William B. Lindsey, politician
- Pauline C. Morton, educator and activist
- Charlie Peete (1929-1956), baseball player
- William V. Rawlings, attorney and politician
- Fleming Rutledge (1937-), preacher, author, and Episcopalian priest
- B. Scott, television personality, radio show host, and internet celebrity
- Greg Scott (1979- ), professional football player, philanthropist
- Randolph Scott, film actor
- Charlie Whitehead, soul singer

== See also ==
- National Register of Historic Places listings in Franklin, Virginia
