= Mississippi literature =

The literature of Mississippi, United States, includes fiction, poetry, and nonfiction. Mississippi has a literary tradition that arose from a diverse mix of cultures and races. Traditional themes from this genre of literature lean towards the past, conflict and change, and southern history in general; however, in the modern era, work have shifted towards deeply Southern works that do not rely on these traditional themes.

Some prominent writers from Mississippi's past include William Faulkner, Richard Wright, Tennessee Williams, Eudora Welty and Shelby Foote, while modern writers include John Grisham, Natasha Trethewey, Jesmyn Ward, and Michael Farris Smith.

== History ==
=== Early history (1800s–1920s) ===
Beginning from statehood in 1817, Mississippi played a very small role in United States literature. Weber (1898) mentioned that at the time of his writing, Mississippi had "few grounds for boasting. The list of Mississippi books is not long; the average quality is nothing. Of pure literature, of the real literature of power, we have contributed scarcely 50 pages to the world's store."

Mississippi's general trend of apathy towards serious literature continued into the 1920s, with Elsie Dersham (1921) reiterating Weber's statements in "An Outline of American State Literature" and discussing lost opportunities to add to Mississippi's literary repertoire. The author writes:

Mississippi has contributed much more to politics than to literature. With the single exception of the poems of Irvin Russel, Mississippi has produced nothing which literary men have been willing to give a place in American literature. She has many interesting Indian legends and negro folk tales, and accounts of the doings of Mississippian laws that should be collected and made a part of her literature. Williams Ward is one of Mississippi's best poets and is the author of the well known poem "Katie Did."

=== Literary beginnings (1930s–1940s) ===
William Faulkner and Eudora Welty both published many of their most significant works during the 1930s and 1940s, drawing international attention to Mississippi. Faulkner published The Sound and The Fury (1929), As I Lay Dying (1930), Light in August (1932), and Absalom, Absalom! (1936). In 1949, Faulkner was awarded the Nobel Prize for Literature. Welty published her short story collections A Curtain Green (1941), Music from Spain (1948), and The Golden Apples (1949) in the forties, as well as her first novel Delta Wedding in 1946. Margaret Walker published her first poetry collection For My People in 1942 before moving to Mississippi.

=== Civil rights era (1950s–1970s) ===
The University Press of Mississippi began operating in 1970. With the support of the state's eight public universities and the Mississippi Institutes of Higher Learning, the press publishes around 85 books a year on topics concerning the culture of the South, expert books, and writings related to specialized topics, such as African American, Caribbean, and pop culture studies.

=== Modern era (1980s-present) ===
In the modern era, writers have shifted towards deeply Southern works that do not necessarily rely on traditional themes related to the Lost Cause and racial conflict. The change in race relations over the years contributed to the expansion of topics from race to broader areas such as the working class and underdogs.

Beginning in 2005 and relaunching in 2016, The Cirlot Agency, located in Jackson, ran advertisements promoting the state's literary history as part of the Mississippi, Believe It! campaign. The campaign cited William Faulkner, Tennessee Williams, Richard Wright, and John Grisham as a few examples of Mississippi's literary heritage.

In 2018, the Mississippi Arts Commission and Mississippi Humanities Council announced intentions for the Mississippi Writers Trail, modeled off of the Mississippi Blues Trail and Freedom Trail. The markers, shaped like open books, will be placed in strategic locations related to the author. The first two markers were unveiled at the 2018 Mississippi Book Festival; they are for Eudora Welty and Jesmyn Ward, which represents both past and present contributions of Mississippi authors. Receipt and placement of trail markers will be determined by scholar recommendations.

== Notable authors ==
Some highlighted Mississippi authors include:

- William Attaway
- Larry Brown
- Ellen Douglas
- William Faulkner
- Richard Ford
- Ellen Gilchrist
- John Grisham
- Barry Hannah
- Beth Henley
- Kiese Laymon
- T.K. Lee
- Catherine Pierce
- Terry Lynn Thomas
- Natasha Trethewey
- Margaret Walker
- Jesmyn Ward
- Ida B. Wells
- Eudora Welty
- Tennessee Williams
- Richard Wright
- Stark Young
