= Death of a Salesman (disambiguation) =

Death of a Salesman is a play by Arthur Miller.

Death of a Salesman may also refer to:

- Death of a Salesman (1951 film)
- Death of a Salesman (1961 film)
- Death of a Salesman (1966 U.S. film), television film that aired on CBS
- Death of a Salesman (1966 UK film), television film that aired on BBC
- Death of a Salesman (1968 film)
- Death of a Salesman (1985 film) with Dustin Hoffman as Willie Loman
- Death of a Salesman (1996 film) with Warren Mitchell as Willie Loman
- Death of a Salesman (2000 film) with Brian Dennehy as Willie Loman
- Death of a Salesman (song), from the album The Great Destroyer, by Low
- Death of a Traveling Salesman, a short story by Eudora Welty

== See also ==
- Dearth of a Salesman (disambiguation)
