= Southern United States literature =

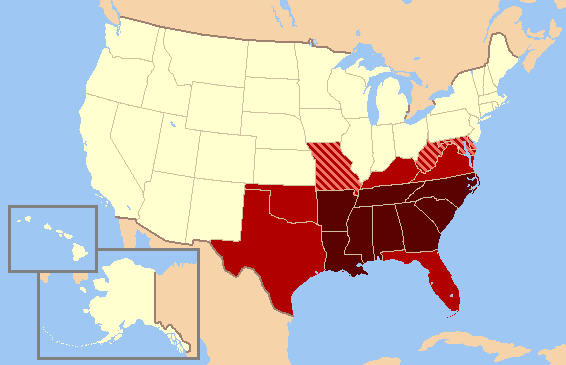
17 states and Washington, D.C. are defined as the Southern region of the United States by the Census Bureau. The 13 states in dark red and solid red are usually considered part of the South. The inclusion of some of the four states in stripes is sometimes disputed. The Census Bureau does not include Missouri, but parts of that state are considered culturally more Southern than Delaware, another state colored here in stripes, which the Census Bureau includes in the Southern region. Southern literary studies questions these geographic boundaries.

Southern United States literature consists of American literature written about the Southern United States or by writers from the region. Literature written about the American South first began during the colonial era, and developed significantly during and after the period of slavery in the United States. Traditional historiography of Southern United States literature emphasized a unifying history of the region; the significance of family in the South's culture, a sense of community and the role of the individual, justice, the dominance of Christianity and the positive and negative impacts of religion, racial tensions, social class and the usage of local dialects. However, in recent decades, the scholarship of the New Southern Studies has decentralized these conventional tropes in favor of a more geographically, politically, and ideologically expansive "South" or "Souths".

== Overview ==
In its simplest form, Southern literature consists of writing about the American South. Often, "the South" is defined, for historical as well as geographical reasons, as the states of South Carolina, Georgia, Florida, Alabama, North Carolina, Virginia, Tennessee, Mississippi, Louisiana, Texas, Oklahoma, Kentucky, West Virginia and Arkansas. Pre-Civil War definitions of the South often included Missouri, Maryland, and Delaware as well. However, "the South" is also a social, political, economic, and cultural construct that transcends these geographical boundaries.

Southern literature has been described by scholars as occupying a liminal space within wider American culture. After the American Revolution, writers in the U.S. from outside the South frequently othered Southern culture, in particular slavery, as a method of "[standing] apart from the imperial world order". These negative portrayals of the American South eventually diminished after the abolition of slavery in the U.S., particularly during a period after the Spanish–American War when many Americans began to re-evaluate their anti-imperialistic views and support for imperialism grew. Changing historiographical trends have placed racism in the American South as emblematic of, rather than an exception to, U.S. racism as a whole.

In addition to the geographical component of Southern literature, certain themes have appeared because of the similar histories of the Southern states in regard to American slavery, the Civil War, and the reconstruction era. The conservative culture in the American South has also produced a strong focus within Southern literature on the significance of family, religion, community in one's personal and social life, the use of Southern dialects, and a strong sense of "place." The South's troubled history with racial issues also continually appears in its literature.

Despite these common themes, there is debate as to what makes a literary work "Southern." For example, Mark Twain, a Missourian, defined the characteristics that many people associate with Southern writing in his novel Adventures of Huckleberry Finn. Truman Capote, born and raised in the Deep South, is best known for his novel In Cold Blood, a piece with none of the characteristics associated with "southern writing." Other Southern writers, such as popular authors Anne Rice and John Grisham, rarely write about traditional Southern literary issues. John Berendt, who wrote the popular Midnight in the Garden of Good and Evil, is not a Southerner. In addition, some famous Southern writers moved to the Northern U.S. So while geography is a factor, the geographical location of the author is not the defining factor in Southern writing. Some suggest that "Southern" authors write in their individual way due to the impact of the strict cultural decorum in the South and the need to break away from it.

== History ==
=== Early and antebellum literature ===
The earliest literature written in what would become the American South dates back to the colonial era, in particular Virginia; the explorer John Smith wrote an account of the founding of the colonial settlement of Jamestown in the early 17th century, while planter William Byrd II kept a diary of his day-to-day affairs during the early 18th century. Both sets of recollections are critical documents in early Southern history.

After the American Revolution, in the early 19th century, the expansion of Southern plantations fueled by slave labor began to distinguish Southern society and culture more clearly from the other states of the young nations. During this antebellum period, South Carolina, and particularly the city of Charleston, rivaled and perhaps surpassed Virginia as a literary community. Writing in Charleston, the lawyer and essayist Hugh Swinton Legare, the poets Paul Hamilton Hayne and Henry Timrod, and the novelist William Gilmore Simms composed some of the most important works in antebellum Southern literature. In Virginia, John Pendleton Kennedy gave an account of Virginia plantation life in his 1832 book Swallow Barn.

Simms was a particularly significant figure, perhaps the most prominent Southern author before the American Civil War. His novels of frontier life and the American revolution celebrated the history of South Carolina. Like James Fenimore Cooper, Simms was strongly influenced by Scottish author Walter Scott, and his works bore the imprint of Scott's romanticism. In The Yemassee, The Kinsmen, and the anti-Uncle Tom's Cabin novel The Sword and the Distaff, Simms presented idealized portraits of slavery and Southern life. While popular and well regarded in South Carolina—and highly praised by such critics as Edgar Allan Poe—Simms never gained a large national audience.

In Virginia, George Tucker produced in 1824 the first fiction of Virginia colonial life with The Valley of Shenandoah. He followed in 1827 with one of the country's first science fictions, A Voyage to the Moon: With Some Account of the Manners and Customs, Science and Philosophy, of the People of Morosofia, and Other Lunarians. Tucker was the first Professor of Moral Philosophy at the University of Virginia. In 1836 Tucker published the first comprehensive biography of Thomas Jefferson - The Life of Thomas Jefferson, Third President of the United States. Some critics also regard Poe as a Southern author—he was raised in Richmond, attended the University of Virginia, and edited the Southern Literary Messenger from 1835 to 1837. Yet in his poetry and fiction Poe rarely took up distinctly Southern themes or subjects; his status as a "Southern" writer remains ambiguous.

In the Chesapeake region, meanwhile, antebellum authors of enduring interest include John Pendleton Kennedy, whose novel Swallow Barn offered a colorful sketch of Virginia plantation life; and Nathaniel Beverley Tucker, whose 1836 work The Partisan Leader foretold the secession of the Southern states, and imagined a guerrilla war in Virginia between federal and secessionist armies.

Not all noteworthy Southern authors during this period were white. Frederick Douglass's Narrative is perhaps the most famous first-person account of black slavery in the antebellum South. Harriet Jacobs, meanwhile, recounted her experiences in bondage in North Carolina in Incidents in the Life of a Slave Girl. And another Southern-born ex-slave, William Wells Brown, wrote Clotel; or, The President's Daughter—widely believed to be the first novel ever published by an African-American. The book depicts the life of its title character, a daughter of Thomas Jefferson and his black mistress, and her struggles under slavery.

=== The "Lost Cause" years ===
In the second half of the 19th century, the South lost the Civil War and suffered through what many white Southerners considered a harsh occupation (called Reconstruction). In place of the anti-Tom literature came poetry and novels about the "Lost Cause of the Confederacy." This nostalgic literature began to appear almost immediately after the war ended; The Conquered Banner was published on June 24, 1865. These writers idealized the defeated South and its lost culture. Prominent writers with this point of view included poets Henry Timrod, Daniel B. Lucas, and Abram Joseph Ryan, and fiction writer Thomas Nelson Page. Others, like African American writer Charles W. Chesnutt, dismissed this nostalgia by pointing out the racism and exploitation of blacks that happened during this time period in the South.

in 1856 George Tucker completed his final multivolume work in his History of the United States, From Their Colonization to the End of the 26th Congress, in 1841.

In 1884, Mark Twain published what is arguably the most influential Southern novel of the 19th century, Adventures of Huckleberry Finn. Ernest Hemingway said of the novel, "All modern American literature comes from one book by Mark Twain called Huckleberry Finn." This statement applies even more to Southern literature because of the novel's frank dealings with issues such as race and violence.

Kate Chopin was another central figure in post-Civil War Southern literature. Focusing her writing largely on the French Creole communities of Louisiana, Chopin established her literary reputation with the short story collections Bayou Folk (1894) and A Night in Acadie (1897). These stories offered not only a sociological portrait of a specific Southern culture but also furthered the legacy of the American short story as a uniquely vital and complex narrative genre. But it was with the publication of her second and final novel The Awakening (1899) that she gained notoriety of a different sort. The novel shocked audiences with its frank and unsentimental portrayal of female sexuality and psychology. It paved the way for the Southern novel as both a serious genre (based in the realism that had dominated the Western novel since Balzac) and one that tackled the complex and untidy emotional lives of its characters. Today she is widely regarded as not only one of the most important female writers in American literature, but one of the most important chroniclers of the post-Civil War South and one of the first writers to treat the female experience with complexity and without condescension.

During the first half of the 20th century, the lawyer, politician, minister, orator, actor, and author Thomas Dixon, Jr., wrote a number of novels, plays, sermons, and non-fiction pieces which were very popular with the general public all over the USA. Dixon's greatest fame came from a trilogy of novels about Reconstruction, one of which was entitled The Clansman (1905), a book and then a wildly successful play, which would eventually become the inspiration for D. W. Griffith's highly controversial 1915 film The Birth of a Nation. Overall Dixon wrote 22 novels, numerous plays and film scripts, Christian sermons, and some non-fiction works.

=== The Southern Renaissance ===
In the 1920s and 1930s, a renaissance in Southern literature began with the appearance of writers such as William Faulkner, Katherine Anne Porter, Caroline Gordon, Allen Tate, Thomas Wolfe, Robert Penn Warren, and Tennessee Williams, among others. Because of the distance the Southern Renaissance authors had from the American Civil War and slavery, they were more objective in their writings about the South. During the 1920s, Southern poetry thrived under the Vanderbilt "Fugitives". In nonfiction, H.L. Mencken's popularity increased nationwide as he shocked and astounded readers with his satiric writing highlighting the inability of the South to produce anything of cultural value. In reaction to Mencken's essay, "The Sahara of the Bozart," the Southern Agrarians (also based mostly around Vanderbilt) called for a return to the South's agrarian past and bemoaned the rise of Southern industrialism and urbanization. They noted that creativity and industrialism were not compatible and desired the return to a lifestyle that would afford the Southerner leisure (a quality the Agrarians most felt conducive to creativity). Writers like Faulkner, who won the Nobel Prize in Literature for 1949, also brought new techniques such as stream of consciousness and complex narrative techniques to their writings. For instance, his novel As I Lay Dying is told by changing narrators ranging from the deceased Addie to her young son.

The late 1930s also saw the publication of one of the best-known Southern novels, Gone with the Wind by Margaret Mitchell. The novel, published in 1936, quickly became a bestseller. It won the 1937 Pulitzer Prize, and in 1939 an equally famous movie of the novel premiered. In the eyes of some modern scholars, Mitchell's novel consolidated white supremacist Lost Cause ideologies (see Lost Cause of the Confederacy) to construct a bucolic plantation South in which slavery was a benign, or even benevolent, institution. Under this view, she presents white southerners as victims of a rapacious Northern industrial capitalism and depicts black southerners as either lazy, stupid, and over sexualized, or as docile, childlike, and resolutely loyal to their white masters. Southern literature has always drawn audiences outside the South and outside the United States, and Gone with the Wind has continued to popularize harmful stereotypes of southern history and culture for audiences around the world. Despite this criticism, Gone with the Wind has enjoyed an enduring legacy as the most popular American novel ever written, an incredible achievement for a female writer. Since publication, Gone with the Wind has become a staple in many Southern homes.

=== Post World War II Southern literature ===
Southern literature following the Second World War grew thematically as it embraced the social and cultural changes in the South resulting from the Civil Rights Movement. In addition, more non-Christian, homosexual, female and African-American writers began to be accepted as part of Southern literature, including African Americans such as Zora Neale Hurston and Sterling Allen Brown, along with women such as Eudora Welty, Flannery O'Connor, Ellen Glasgow, Carson McCullers, Katherine Anne Porter, and Shirley Ann Grau, among many others. Other well-known Southern writers of this period include Reynolds Price, James Dickey, William Price Fox, Davis Grubb, Walker Percy, and William Styron. One of the most highly praised Southern novels of the 20th century, To Kill a Mockingbird by Harper Lee, won the Pulitzer Prize when it was published in 1960. New Orleans native and Harper Lee's friend, Truman Capote also found great success in the middle 20th century with Breakfast at Tiffany's and later In Cold Blood. Another famous novel of the 1960s is A Confederacy of Dunces, written by New Orleans native John Kennedy Toole in the 1960s but not published until 1980. It won the Pulitzer Prize in 1981 and has since become a cult classic.

Southern poetry bloomed in the decades following the Second World War in large part thanks to the writing and efforts of Robert Penn Warren and James Dickey. Where earlier work primarily championed a white, agrarian past, the efforts of such poets as Dave Smith, Charles Wright, Ellen Bryant Voigt, Yusef Komunyakaa, Jim Seay, Frank Stanford, Kate Daniels, James Applewhite, Betty Adcock, Rodney Jones, and former U.S. Poet Laureate Natasha Trethewey have opened up the subject matter and form of Southern poetry.

== Contemporary Southern literature ==
Today, in the early twenty-first century, the American South is undergoing a number of cultural and social changes, including rapid industrialization/deindustrialization, climate change, and an influx of immigrants. As a result, the exact definition of what constitutes Southern literature is changing. While some critics specify that the previous definitions of Southern literature still hold, with some of them suggesting, only somewhat in jest, that all Southern literature must still contain a dead mule within its pages, most scholars of the twenty-first century South highlight the proliferation of depictions of "Souths": urban, undead, queer, activist, televisual, cinematic, and particularly multiethnic (particularly Latinos, Native American, and African American). Not only do these critics argue that the very fabric of the South has changed so much that the old assumptions about southern literature no longer hold, but they argue that the U.S. South has always been a construct.

Among today's prominent southern writers are Dorothy Allison, Wendell Berry, Larry Brown, Wiley Cash, Pat Conroy, Clyde Edgerton, Claudia Emerson, Fannie Flagg, Horton Foote, Tim Gautreaux, Ernest Gaines. William Gay, John Grisham, Silas House, Edward P. Jones, Randall Kenan, Barbara Kingsolver, Maurice Manning, Cormac McCarthy, Jill McCorkle, Ron Rash, Ferrol Sams, Lee Smith, Donna Tartt, Natasha Trethewey, Alice Walker, Daniel Wallace, Jesmyn Ward, and Tom Wolfe.

== Selected journals ==
- Black Warrior Review — Published by University of Alabama
- Georgia Review — Published by University of Georgia
- Gulf Coast: A Journal of Literature and Fine Arts — Published at the University of Houston.
- Jabberwock Review — published by Mississippi State University
- Southern Literary Journal and Monthly Magazine — (1835–1837)
- Sewanee Review — America's oldest continuously published literary quarterly (published at the University of the South)
- Shenandoah — Published by Washington and Lee University
- Southern Literary Journal — (1964–present)
- Mississippi Quarterly — A refereed, scholarly journal dedicated to the life and culture of the American South, past and present.
- The Oxford American — A quarterly journal of fiction, nonfiction, poetry, photography, and music from and about the South.
- The Southern Review — The famous literary journal focusing on southern literature.
- storySouth — A journal of new writings from the American South. Features fiction, poetry, nonfiction, and more.
- Southern Cultures — Peer-reviewed quarterly of the history, arts, and cultures of the US South, published since 1993, from the UNC Center for the Study of the American South.
- Southern Spaces — Peer-Reviewed Internet journal examining the spaces and places of the American South.

== Notable works ==
Around 2000 "the 'James Agee Film Project' conducted a poll of book editors, publishers, scholars and reviewers, asking which of the thousands of Southern prose works published during the past century should be considered 'the most remarkable works of modern Southern Literature." Results of the poll yielded the following titles:

Title	Author	Year
Invisible Man	Ralph Ellison	1952
Let Us Now Praise Famous Men	James Agee	1941
The Sound and the Fury	William Faulkner	1929
Mind of the South	Wilbur Cash	1929
Look Homeward, Angel	Thomas Wolfe	1929
To Kill a Mockingbird	Harper Lee	1960
The Color Purple	Alice Walker	1982
Their Eyes Were Watching God	Zora Neale Hurston	1937
Absalom, Absalom!	William Faulkner	1936
Lanterns on the Levee	William Alexander Percy	1941
All the King's Men	Robert Penn Warren	1946
Collected Stories	Eudora Welty	1980
Civil War: A Narrative	Shelby Foote	1958–1974
Moviegoer	Walker Percy	1961
Tobacco Road	Erskine Caldwell	1932
Black Boy	Richard Wright	1945
Cane	Jean Toomer	1923
Native Son	Richard Wright	1940
As I Lay Dying	William Faulkner	1930
Gone with the Wind	Margaret Mitchell	1936
Up from Slavery	Booker T. Washington	1901
Last Gentleman	Walker Percy	1966
Complete Stories	Flannery O'Connor	1971
Collected Stories	Katherine Anne Porter	1965
Autobiography of Miss Jane Pittman	Ernest J. Gaines	1971

== See also ==
- Literature of Southern states: Alabama; Arkansas; Florida; Georgia; Kentucky; Louisiana; Maryland; Mississippi, North Carolina; South Carolina; Tennessee; Texas; Virginia; West Virginia
- American literary regionalism
- Southern Gothic
- Southern noir
- Fellowship of Southern Writers
- African-American literature
- Louisiana State University Press

== Bibliography ==
- Louise Manly (1895). Southern Literature from 1579-1895. Richmond: B.F. Johnson Publishing Company – via Project Gutenberg.

=== published in 20th c. ===
- Edwin Anderson Alderman; Joel Chandler Harris; Charles William Kent (eds.). Library of Southern Literature. Atlanta: Martin and Hoyt Company – via HathiTrust. 1909-1913 (16 volumes)
- Montrose Jonas Moses (1910). Literature of the South. New York: Thomas Y. Crowell Co.
- Beatty, Richmond C.; Watkins, Floyd C.; Young, Thomas Daniel, eds. (1952). The Literature of the South. Glenview, Illinois: Scott, Foresman and Company.
- Parks, Edd Winfield (1962). Ante-Bellum Southern Literary Critics. Athens, GA: University of Georgia Press.
- Marion Montgomery, "The Sense of Violation: Notes toward a Definition of 'Southern' Fiction," The Georgia Review, 19 (1965)
- Holman, C. Hugh (1966). Three Modes of Modern Southern Fiction: Ellen Glasgow, William Faulkner, Thomas Wolfe. Athens, Georgia: University of Georgia Press. OCLC 859825215.
- Holman, C. Hugh; Rubin, Louis D. Jr.; Sullivan, Walter (1969). Southern Fiction: Renaissance and Beyond. Athens, Georgia: University of Georgia Press. OCLC 489993640.
- Flannery O'Connor, "Some Aspects of the Grotesque in Southern Fiction," in Mystery and Manners, ed. Sally and Robert Fitzgerald (Farrar, Straus and Giroux, 1969)
- Davis, Richard Beale; Holman, C. Hugh; Rubin, Louis D. Jr. (1970). Southern Writing, 1585-1920. New York: Odyssey Press. OCLC 907422022.
- Holman, C. Hugh (1972). The Roots of Southern Writing. Athens, Georgia: University of Georgia Press. ISBN 9780820302904.
- Holman, C. Hugh; Rubin, Louis D. Jr. (1975). Southern Literary Study: Promise and Possibilities. University of North Carolina Press. ISBN 9780807812525.
- Holman, C. Hugh (1977). The Immoderate Past: The Southern Writer and History. University of Georgia Press. ISBN 9780820304199.
- Michael O'Brien (1979). The Idea of the American South, 1920-1941. Johns Hopkins University Press. ISBN 978-0801840173
- Charles Reagan Wilson; William Ferris, eds. (1989). Encyclopedia of Southern Culture. University of North Carolina Press. ISBN 0807818232.. Fulltext articles via the university's "Documenting the American South" website:
  - Beginnings of Southern Literature, Antebellum Era, Autobiography, Biography, Black Literature, Civil War in Literature, Folklore in Literature, Humor in Literature, Local Color Era, Regionalism and Local Color, Travel Writing
- The History of Southern Literature by Louis Rubin. Louisiana State University Press, 1991.
- Louis D. Rubin Jr., "From Combray to Ithaca; or, The 'Southernness' of Southern Literature," in The Mockingbird in the Gum Tree (Louisiana State University Press, 1991)
- Veronica Makowsky (1996), Walker Percy and Southern Literature (Explores the overall issues surrounding what makes for southern literature)
- Michael Kreyling (1998). Inventing Southern Literature. University Press of Mississippi. ISBN 978-1-60473-776-9.
- Fred Hobson (1999). But Now I See: The White Southern Racial Conversion Narrative. Louisiana State University Press. ISBN 978-0-8071-4078-9.
- Ronald Lora; William Henry Longton, eds. (1999). "Southern Reviews, 1828-1880". Conservative Press in Eighteenth-and Nineteenth-century America. Greenwood. pp. 147–282. ISBN 978-0-313-31043-0.
- Ernest Suarez (1999). Southbound: Interviews with Southern Poets. University of Missouri Press. ISBN 978-0-8262-6168-7.
- Richard J. Gray (2000). Southern Aberrations: Writers of the American South and the Problem of Regionalism. Louisiana State University Press. ISBN 978-0-8071-2552-6.
- Jerry Leath Mills (2000). "The Dead Mule Rides Again". Southern Culture. 6 (4).. (Explanation of what constitutes "good" southern writing)
- Patricia Yeager (2000). Dirt and Desire: Reconstructing Southern Women's Writing, 1930-1990. University of Chicago Press. ISBN 978-0226944913.

=== published in 21st c. ===
- Houston A. Baker (2001). Turning South Again: Re-Thinking Modernism/Re-Reading Booker T.. Duke University Press. ISBN 978-0822326953.
- Joseph M. Flora; Lucinda Hardwick MacKethan, eds. (2001). Companion to Southern Literature: Themes, Genres, Places, People, Movements, and Motifs. Louisiana State University Press. ISBN 978-0-8071-2692-9.
- Where is the South in Today's Southern Literature? Article exploring 2002 changes in southern literature.
- The New Dictionary of Cultural Literacy, Third Edition: What Every American Needs to Know Edited by James Trefil, Joseph F. Kett, and E. D. Hirsch. Houghton Mifflin, 2002.
- Carolyn Perry; Mary Louise Weaks, eds. (2002). History of Southern Women's Literature. Louisiana State University Press. ISBN 978-0-8071-2753-7.
- Suzanne W. Jones; Sharon Monteith, eds. (2002). South to A New Place: Region, Literature, Culture. Southern Literary Studies. Louisiana State University Press. ISBN 978-0-8071-2840-4.
- Tara McPherson (2003). Reconstructing Dixie: Race, Gender, and Nostalgia in the Imagined South. Duke University Press. ISBN 978-0822330400.
- "Genres of Southern Literature" by Lucinda MacKethan. Southern Spaces, Feb. 2004.
- Jon Smith; Deborah Cohn, eds. (2004). Look Away! The U.S. South in New World Studies. Duke University Press. ISBN 978-0822333166.
- Leigh Anne Duck (2006). The Nation's Region: Southern Modernism, Segregation, and U.S. Nationalism. University of Georgia Press. ISBN 978-0820334189.
- Riché Richardson (2007). Black Masculinity and the U.S. South: From Uncle Tom to Gangsta. University of Georgia Press. ISBN 978-0820328904.
- Anderson, Eric Gary. "On Native Ground: Indigenous Presences and Countercolonial Strategies in Southern Narratives of Captivity, Removal, and Repossession" Southern Spaces. August 9, 2007.
- Leigh Anne Duck (July 2008). "Southern Nonidentity." Safundi: The Journal of South African and American Studies, 9 (3): 319–330.
- Harilaos Stecopoulos (2008). Reconstructing the World: Southern Fictions and U.S. Imperialisms, 1898-1976. Cornell University Press. ISBN 978-0801475023.
- M. Thomas Inge, ed. (2008). Literature. Vol. 9. University of North Carolina Press. ISBN 9781469616643. OCLC 910189354.
- Scott Romine (2008). The Real South: Southern Narrative in the Age of Cultural Reproduction. Louisiana State University Press. ISBN 978-0807156384.
- Jennifer Rae Greeson (2010). Our South: Geographic Fantasy and the Rise of National Literature. Harvard University Press. ISBN 978-0674024281.
- Thadious M. Davis (2011). Southscapes: Geographies of Race, Region, and Literature. University of North Carolina Press. ISBN 978-0807835210.
- Deborah Barker; Kathryn McKee, eds. (2011). American Cinema and the Southern Imaginary. University of Georgia Press. ISBN 978-0820337104.
- Jonathan Daniel Wells (2011). Women Writers and Journalists in the Nineteenth-Century South. Cambridge University Press. ISBN 978-1-139-50349-5.
- Melanie Benson Taylor (2012). Reconstructing the Native South: American Indian Literature and the Lost Cause. University of Georgia Press. ISBN 978-0820338842.
- Jay Watson (2012). Reading for the Body: The Recalcitrant Materiality of Southern Fiction, 1893-1985. University of Georgia Press. ISBN 978-0820343389.
- Richard Gray (2012). "Regionalism in the South". A History of American Literature (2nd ed.). John Wiley & Sons. ISBN 978-1-4443-4568-1.
- Keith Cartwright (2013). Sacral Grooves, Limbo Gateways: Travels in Deep Southern Time, Circum-Caribbean Space, Afro-Creole Authority. University of Georgia Press. ISBN 978-0820345994.
- Matthew Pratt Guterl (2013). American Mediterranean: Southern Slaveholders in the Age of Emancipation. Harvard University Press. ISBN 978-0674072282.
- Claudia Milian (2013). Latining America: Black-Brown Passages and the Coloring of Latino/a Studies. University of Georgia Press. ISBN 978-0820344362.
- Jon Smith (2013). Finding Purple America: The South and the Future of American Cultural Studies. University of Georgia Press. ISBN 978-0820345260.
- Jason Phillips, ed. (2013). Storytelling, History, and the Postmodern South. Louisiana State University Press. ISBN 978-0-8071-5035-1.
- David A. Davis; Tara Powell, eds. (2014). Writing in the Kitchen: Essays on Southern Literature and Foodways. University Press of Mississippi. ISBN 978-1-62674-210-9.
- Eric Gary Anderson; Taylor Hagood; Daniel Cross Turner, eds. (2015). Undead Souths: The Gothic and Beyond in Southern Literature and Culture. Louisiana State University Press. ISBN 978-0807161074.
- Martyn Bone; Brian Ward; William A. Link, eds. (2015). Creating and Consuming the American South. University Press of Florida. ISBN 978-0813060699.
- Fred Hobson; Barbara Ladd, eds. (2016). Oxford Handbook of the Literature of the U.S. South. Oxford University Press. ISBN 978-0-19-049394-3.
- Susan Castillo Street; Charles L. Crow, eds. (2016). Palgrave Handbook of the Southern Gothic. Springer. ISBN 978-1-137-47774-3.
- Jennifer Rae Greeson; Scott Romine, eds. (2016). Keywords for Southern Studies. University of Georgia Press. ISBN 978-0820349626.
