= Tennessee literature =

The literature of Tennessee in the United States includes fiction, non-fiction, and poetry, ranging from Independence through to the present. This literature encompasses texts produced by those native to Tennessee as well as texts which relate to the history and culture of Tennessee. The literary scene within Tennessee today is also included in the literature of Tennessee.

== American independence through to the end of the Civil War ==
This is known in the South as the Antebellum era. It can be discerned from other literary periods through the themes which authors at the time grappled with, such as the justification of slavery. A notable work produced in this period is George Tucker's The Valley of Shenandoah (1824), which explored life on a Virginia plantation whilst also uniquely criticizing slavery.

== Pre-WW2 ==
Following the civil war, the American South went through a period known as Reconstruction, during which Tennessee was forced to reform its laws regarding the rights of African Americans and its economy which had relied on slave labor previously. This occurred after Tennessee was the first secession state to return to the United States. The period of reconstruction allowed some cultural and economic flourishing to occur. This included a reduced dependence on black labor, resulting in a less agricultural economy with more emphasis on manufacturing. The era of Reconstruction also led to the founding of Vanderbilt University in 1873, in the city of Nashville, thanks largely in part to $1 million in funding from Cornelius Vanderbilt, who aspired to create a university that would, “contribute to strengthening the ties that should exist between all sections of our common country”.

The 1920s introduced the group of poets known as the Fugitives to the United States literary scene. This group began meeting in 1914 also published a journal called Fugitive between 1922 and 1925. The original members of the group consisted of Donald Davidson, Alec B. Stevenson, William Yandel Elliott, Stanley Johnson, Walter Clyde Curry, John Crowe Ransom and Sidney Mttron Hirsch. The Fugitives would discuss topics relating to literature and philosophy, often sparked by their university reading programs or the subjects in which they were enrolled. Davidson speaks more of the substance of the meetings, “[The discussions] ranged through poetry to philosophy, but became predominantly philosophical whenever in those years Ransom, Elliott and Johnson led the conversation into some logical dispute, as it seemed to me they too often did.” By 1922, the group began publishing their journal, in which they published their poetry. This journal was considered by contemporary critics to be influential and a part of a cultural flourishing of Southern American poetry.

In the late 1920s and leading up the Second World War, the south of the United States experienced the “Southern Renaissance”. This is the title used to describe a particular movement in which the creative output of southern authors was very high and was well-received across the United States. Most authors wrestled with conservative themes, such as anti-industrialization. One example of a group of such authors who rose to prominence during this period was the Agrarians, a group of poets largely founded by members of the Fugitives. The Agrarians used poetry and essays to rail against the modernist perspectives beginning to take hold within the south, as well as what became known as urban industrialism, a progressive development of the South and a disruption of their traditional agricultural way of life. A notable essay published by the Agrarians is “I’ll Take My Stand: The South and the Agrarian Tradition”.

== Post-WW2 ==
Some representative authors from this period include James Agee, Cormac McCarthy, Peter Taylor, Shelby Foote, and Allen Tate. During this period, the social and artistic movement of Postmodernism pervaded the literature of the United States.

=== James Agee ===
James Agee was a screenwriter, essayist, and novelist. Agee was an influential film critic in the United States in the 1940s and 1950s whilst also producing classics such as A Death in the Family and Let Us Now Praise Famous Men. He also won a posthumous Pulitzer Prize in 1958.

=== Cormac McCarthy ===
Another notable author from this period is Cormac McCarthy. McCarthy is known for advancing the style known as Southern Gothic and exploring human desires and motivations by building worlds in which normal laws and moral codes do not apply. Notable works include his two novels The Road and No Country for Old Men, both of which were adapted into feature films and subsequently critically acclaimed.

=== Peter Taylor ===
Peter Taylor was a short story writer and novelist who won a Pulitzer Prize for his novel A Summons to Memphis, in 1987. The Washington Post quotes Taylor's agent as describing Taylor's work as “usually unfolding through narrators, typically well bred, thoughtful Tennesseans with confident exteriors that hid insecurities and inner turmoil”. The New York Times describes Taylor as being “arguably the past century’s best American practitioner of the short story”, despite only achieving proper fame upon receiving a Pulitzer Prize for a novel.

=== Shelby Foote ===
Shelby Foote was a novelist and historian, who published several novels and short stories but is primarily known for his work The Civil War: A Narrative, a three volume history of the American Civil War. Foote was born in Greenville, Mississippi in 1916. He moved to Memphis in 1954 and stayed there for several decades after. In an interview with the Paris Review, Foote speaks of the conflict between is role as both a novelist and an historian, “I think of myself as a novelist who wrote a three-volume history of the Civil War. I don’t think it’s a novel, but I think it’s certainly by a novelist. The novels are not novels written by a historian. My book falls between two stools—academic historians are upset because there are no footnotes and novel readers don’t want to study history. It doesn’t matter who’s a professional historian and who’s not; Herodotus, Thucydides, and Tacitus weren’t professionals—they were literary men. They considered history a branch of literature; so do I, to this day.” Some controversy has followed Foote since the publication of his Civil War history, due to his sympathy for Lost Cause mythology, a pseudohistorical narrative that portrays the Confederate states as gallantly defending their economy, rights and sovereignty from the more populous and industrialized North. This view is widely denounced by 21st century scholars as false, due to its denial of slavery being by far the most important issue the Confederate states were fighting for. More controversy, also from his Civil War history, is his admiring portrayal of Confederate general Nathan Bedford Forest, who was also the first Grand Wizard of the Ku Klux Klan.

== Features of Southern literature ==
=== Southern Gothic ===
Academic T. Bjerre, in Oxford reference, describes Southern Gothic literature as including “the presence of irrational, horrific, and transgressive thoughts, desires, and impulses; grotesque characters; dark humor, and an overall angst-ridden sense of alienation.” It is a prominent style and remains so to this day. Southern Gothic is rooted in the South's dark and controversial history, expressing itself in literature due to the difficulty of exploring this history within public discourse. This is because it consists of subject matter such as the loss of the Civil War, slavery, and the continuation of poor race relations throughout the 20th century (relative to the more progressive northern states). Notable authors include Edgar Allan Poe, a pioneer of the style, and, more recently, William Faulkner.

=== Religion ===
The South, whilst remaining a diverse and pluralistic region, possesses a distinct religiosity characterized by its Protestantism, fundamentalism, and “born-again” ethos. This religiosity is a significant feature of Southern Literature.

=== Sense of place ===
Southern Literature has a strong attachment to the physical surroundings from which it derives, likely due to its agrarian past and its history as a self-defined culture, separate from the rest of the United States in its traditions and way of life. In literature, this feature often reveals itself in the use of derelict and decaying settings, or rural, agricultural settings.

An example of a particularly recent text which embodies all the discussed stylistic aspects of Southern Literature is the 2014 American television series True Detective, created by Nic Pizzolato.

== Tennessee and literary criticism ==
Academic presses within Tennessee include:

- University of Tennessee Press. Established in 1940 as a scholarly publisher, this Press focuses mainly on creating knowledge centered on Tennessee as well as the wider area of the Southern United States. It primarily focuses on the humanities.
- Vanderbilt University Press. Also established in 1940, it has a similar focus on the humanities and social sciences. It publishes academic books whilst also contributing books to the popular realm of the humanities.

== Contemporary Tennessee literature ==
Contemporary Tennessee literature is focused on the literary scenes of Knoxville and Nashville.

=== Local gGroups ===
This literary scene includes events run by the community and literary organization “The Porch”, which includes workshops and speaking events, as well as the annual “The Porch Prize”, which promotes recognition for up and coming writers from Tennessee. Another organization which actively strengthens the literary scene within Tennessee is the Chattanooga Writers Guild (CWG). The CWG started in 2001, by graduates from the University of Tennessee Chattanooga, as a monthly meeting for poetry readings, but quickly expanded into an organization that spans many more demographics and genres. Founding member Jennifer Hoff speaks of this transition on the CWG website: “Because of the success of Poetry Mondays, we decided to explore the possibility of a larger writing group to serve all genres, modelled after the Knoxville Writers Guild.” Today, the CWG has several roles in reaching out to the local community, including running several speakers’ events and workshops.

=== Festivals and events ===
One of several annual conferences for literature in Tennessee is “Killer Nashville”. This conference focuses mainly on the “thriller” genre, and other genres that are adjacent to it. It was founded in 2006 and claims to offer a wealth of networking and learning opportunities for writers, agents, publishers and the like.

=== Non-academic journals and magazines ===
The Pinch, a bi-annual journal published by students currently undertaking the Master of Fine Arts program at the University of Memphis. It publishes a wide variety of fiction, poetry and discursive essays from both students and the wider community of Tennessee and the southern United States. Similar to The Pinch, Grist is an annual literary magazine, published each Spring by students in the creative writing program at the University of Tennessee. Grist included unpublished short stories, poetry and creative nonfiction, whilst also holding the “Pro Forma Contest” each Spring alongside the publication of the magazine.

== See also ==
- Category:Writers from Tennessee
- List of newspapers in Tennessee
- Poetry Society of Tennessee
- Category:Tennessee in fiction
- Category:Libraries in Tennessee
- Southern United States literature
- American literary regionalism

== Bibliography ==
=== Published in 20th century ===
- Knight, Lucian Lamar, ed. (1913). "Fifty Reading Courses: Course XLVII. Tennessee". Library of Southern Literature. Vol. 16. Atlanta, Georgia: Martin and Hoyt. pp. 211–214.
- Dershem, Elsie (1921). "Tennessee". An Outline of American State Literature. Lawrence, Kansas: World Company. p. 159. OCLC 3404797.
- Federal Writers' Project (1939). "Writers of Tennessee". Tennessee: A Guide to the State. American Guide Series. New York: Viking Press. pp. 145–154. OCLC 2479491.
- Harkness, David James (1950). "Tennessee in Recent Books, Music, and Drama". University of Tennessee Newsletter. 29 (1). Knoxville, Tennessee: University of Tennessee. OCLC 7802323.
- Ballentine, Nelle (1960). A Bibliographical Checklist of Knoxville and Memphis Imprints, 1867-1876. Modern Languages Series. Lexington, Kentucky: University of Kentucky Press. OCLC 23633407.
- McClary, Ben Harris (1962). Our Literary Heritage: A Guide for Tennessee in Literature. Athens, Tennessee: Tennessee Wesleyan College. OCLC 16627482.
- Tennessee Council of Teachers of English (1969). Poets in Tennessee: Fifteen Biographical Notes. Martin, Tennessee: University of Tennessee at Martin. OCLC 29892526.
- Hearne, Mary Glenn (1974). Authors of Nashville and Davidson County. Nashville Authors Series. Nashville, Tennessee: Public Library of Nashville and Davidson County. OCLC 8359523.
- Warren, John William; McClaren, Adrian W. (1977). Tennessee Belles-Lettres: A Guide to Tennessee Literature. Morristown, Tennessee: Morrison Printing. OCLC 749619227.
- Young, Thomas Daniel (1981). Tennessee Writers. Tennessee Three Star Books (1st ed.). Knoxville, Tennessee: University of Tennessee Press. ISBN 978-0-87049-320-1. OCLC 7276903.
- Burton, Linda, ed. (1983). Stories from Tennessee (1st ed.). Knoxville, Tennessee: University of Tennessee Press. ISBN 0-87049-376-0. OCLC 8763191.
- Willbanks, Ray, ed. (1984). Literature of Tennessee. Macon, Georgia: Mercer University Press. ISBN 0-86554-139-6. OCLC 10998838.
- Paschall, Douglas; Swanson, Alice, eds. (1986). Homewords: A Book of Tennessee Writers (1st ed.). Knoxville, Tennessee: University of Tennessee Press. ISBN 0-87049-494-5. OCLC 12805392.
- Tickle, Phyllis; Swanson, Alice, eds. (1996). Homeworks: A Book of Tennessee Writers (1st ed.). Knoxville, Tennessee: University of Tennessee Press. ISBN 0-87049-942-4. OCLC 612092258.
- Akin, Nat, ed. (1996). A Tennessee Landscape, People, and Places: 1996 Tennessee Writers Alliance Anthology (1st ed.). Franklin, Tennessee: Cool Springs Press. ISBN 1-888608-32-3. OCLC 36921475.

=== Published in 21st century ===
- Flora, Joseph M.; MacKethan, Lucinda Hardwick; Taylor, Todd, eds. (2002). "Literature of Tennessee". The Companion to Southern Literature: Themes, Genres, Places, People, Movements, and Motifs. Baton Rouge, Louisiana: Louisiana State University Press. ISBN 0-8071-2692-6. OCLC 47054674.
- Ensor, Allison (2009). "Literature". Tennessee Encyclopedia of History and Culture. University of Tennessee Press.
- Renkl, Margaret (July 9, 2018), "What Is a Southern Writer, Anyway?", The New York Times
