= Delta Wedding =

1946 novel by Eudora Welty

- First edition
- Publisher: Harcourt Brace Javanovich
- Publication date: 1946
- Media type: Print (hardback)
- Pages: 336
- OCLC: 290906

Delta Wedding is a 1946 Southern fiction novel by Eudora Welty. Set in 1923, the novel tells of the experiences of the Fairchild family in a domestic drama-filled week leading up to Dabney Fairchild's wedding to the family overseer, Troy Flavin, during an otherwise unexceptional year in the Mississippi Delta.

== Reception ==
The novel's focus on the mundane and social life of the central South elicited considerable critique from contemporary critics. Initial reception of the novel was chequered, with many reviewers challenging the absence of plot. The New York Times praised the characterization of the novel. It describes the novel as going "deep into the motives and moods and compulsions that move her characters".

The interplay of family life, with a dozen different people saying and doing a dozen different things all at the same time, is wonderfully handled by Miss Welty so that no detail is lost, every detail had its place in the pattern of the whole. The transitions are so smoothly made that you seem to be all over the place at once, knowing the living members of three generations and all the skeletons and ghosts.

== Retrospective assessment ==
Critic James Olney at the New York Times observes "The short story is the medium in which Welty has always shown to greatest advantage..." Even as Welty turned to writing novels "she never quite divested herself of the ways of seeing and saying most appropriate to the writing of short fiction."

Biographer Carol Ann Johnston registers disapproval of those critics, and Diana Trilling in particular, who charged Welty with a penchant for lurid Gothic tales and a failure to ostracize the racist legacy of the Old South: "All in all, these critics viewed Welty's work as symptomatic of southern provinciality and of a terminal attachment to the gothic, [and] uncritically romanticizing the past of the slave-owning South."

Claudia Roth Pierpont in The New Yorker also referenced the Trilling criticism:

When Delta Wedding was published, in 1946, critical swoons over Welty's language were mixed with horror at the book's contents. In The Nation, Diana Trilling wrote, quite simply; "This is a value system to which I deeply oppose myself," and Time called it all that could be expected from a member of the Junior League.

== Sources ==
- Johnston, Carol Ann. 1997. Eudora Welty: A Study of the Short Fiction. Twayne Publishers, New York. Gordon Weaver, general editor. ISBN 0-8057-7936-1
- Marrs, Suzanne. 2005. Eudora Welty: A Biography. Harvest Books, Orlando, Florida. ISBN 978-0-15-603063-2 (paperback)
- Olney, James. 1998. Where the Voice Came From. New York Times. November 22, 1998.https://archive.nytimes.com/www.nytimes.com/books/98/11/22/reviews/981122.22olneyt.html Accessed 22 September 2025.
- Pierpont, Claudia Roth. 1998. A Perfect Lady. The New Yorker, October 5, 1998. https://www.newyorker.com/magazine/1998/10/05/a-perfect-lady Accessed 22 September 2025
- Welty, Eudora Welty. 1946. Delta Wedding.Harcourt Brace, New York. OCLC 290906
- Welty, Eudora. 2001. The Collected Stories of Eudora Welta. Barnes & Noble Modern Classics. ISBN 0-7607-2409-1
