= The Robber Bridegroom =

The Robber Bridegroom may refer to:

- The Robber Bridegroom (fairy tale), a German fairy tale collected by the Brothers Grimm
- The Robber Bridegroom (novella), 1942 novella by Eudora Welty, inspired by and loosely based on the Grimm fairy tale
- The Robber Bridegroom (musical), a 1975 Broadway musical, based on the 1942 novella
