= Death of a Traveling Salesman =

"Death of the Traveling Salesman"
- Short story by Eudora Welty
- Country: United States
- Language: English

Publication
- Publisher: Manuscript
- Publication date: May 1936

"Death of a Traveling Salesman" is the first published short story by Eudora Welty, originally appearing in Manuscript magazine in May 1936, and first collected in A Curtain of Green (1941) by Doubleday.

The story is one of Welty's two earliest published works of fiction, along with "Magic", each printed by Manuscript in 1936.

== Background ==
"Writing 'Death of a Traveling Salesman' opened my eyes. And I had received the shock of having touched, for the first time, on my real subject: human relationships. Daydreaming had started me on the way; but story writing, once I was truly in its grip, took me and shook me awake."—Eudora Welty from One Writer's Beginnings (1984)

Welty, in her Preface to The Collected Stories of Eudora Welty (1980), reports that she came to the attention of editors at The Southern Review—among them Robert Penn Warren, Cleanth Brooks and Katherine Anne Porter—after "Death of a Traveling Salesman" was accepted by a small Athens, Ohio journal, Manuscript. Consequently, The Southern Review quarterly carried six of her stories between 1936 and 1939.

Welty wrote her friend and former Columbia schoolmate Frank Lyell in May, 1936, exulting at the publication of the story.

That was a great day in my life because for the first time something was being looked at critically. This [the story] was from afar, an objective point of view, and they liked it and they were going to print it. I didn't give a hoot that they couldn't pay me anything. If they had paid me a million dollars it wouldn't have made any difference. I wanted acceptance and publication.

== Plot ==
The story is presented from the third-person point-of-view.

The traveling salesman is the thirty-something R. J. Bowman, who has sold shoes door-to-door for fourteen years in Mississippi. After a severe bout of influenza, he has returned to his circuit, but has not yet fully recovered. Fatigued and disoriented, he loses control of his car on a rural road and exits it just before it slides over a shallow embankment. Bowman walks to a nearby cabin to seek help, his heart racing from the ordeal.

An elderly woman stands mute in the cabin doorway. He greets her courteously and begins "I wonder if you'd be interested"—then informs her he has had an accident and needs his car towed. The woman responds "Sonny he ain't here." Bowman assumes this is her son, and is informed that he will return soon. When he tells her he is recovering from an illness, she silently escorts him into the dimly lit home, that of the impoverished tenant farmer. Recovering momentarily, Bowman blurts out "I have a nice line women's low-priced shoes" and stops; the woman repeats that Sonny will soon return.

Sonny arrives home accompanied by two hounds. A robust young sharecropper, he is wearing an old but vintage Confederate military coat. The woman explains Bowman's predicament, and Sonny, after silently regarding the visitor, goes to harness his mule and haul the vehicle from the ravine. After he departs, Bowman experiences a powerful emotional impulse to embrace the elderly woman; his heart leaps with joy at her presence.

Though the room is plunged into darkness after sundown, the woman neglects to light the lamp. Sonny enters the darkened house and declares the vehicle is recovered. When Bowman offers Sonny cash for his service he replies: "We don't take money for such." Bowman protests, ready to burst into tears. Suspicious at his behavior, Sonny approaches him and runs his hands over the stranger's body, suspecting that he may be an armed prohibition agent. When Bowman assures him he is not, Sonny escorts him to his illegal prohibition-era still, and they share a jug of hard liquor. Intoxicated, Bowman's perception of the woman is transformed: he sees that she is actually young and shares an intimate relationship with Sonny; the couple are expecting a baby soon. The salesman secretly regrets that the child is not his own.

Bowman lies down to sleep in front of the fireplace, whispering to himself "There will be special reduced prices on all footwear during the month of January." In the middle of the night he absconds from the cabin by moonlight—after leaving all the money in his billfold under a lamp. Upon reaching the road, his heart begins throbbing. He collapses, alone and helpless.

== Structure and theme ==
Literary critic and poet Carol Ann Johnston describes the story "as essentially a narration of Bowman's perceptions." Welty's disruption of the linear narrative serves to document the disintegration of his self-image precipitated by his encounter with the young married couple.

Bowman's struggle with the connection between the couple's relationship and his own inner life allow Welty to concentrate on her visual technique on composition and viewpoint to drive the straightforward plot...This kind of telling reinforces the essentially visual technique that drives the story.

Bowman's epiphany begins to take shape in the following passage as he "recognizes the inherent poverty of his life."

There was nothing remote or mysterious here—only something private. The only secret was the ancient communication between two people. But the memory of the woman's waiting silently beside the cold hearth, of the man's stubborn journey a mile away to get fire, and how they finally brought out their food and drink and filled the room proudly with all they had to show, was suddenly too clear and too enormous within him for response.

Johnston adds: "Welty shows us these things through her scenic organization of the story...We begin to see as [Bowman] begins to see."

== Sources ==
- Johnston, Carol Ann. 1997. Eudora Welty: A Study of the Short Fiction. Twayne Publishers, New York. Gordon Weaver, general editor. ISBN 0-8057-7936-1
- McWhirter, David. 2009. Fish Stories: Revising Masculine Ritual in Eudora Welty's "The Wide Net" The Mississippi Quarterly , April 2009, Supplement: SPECIAL ISSUE: Eudora Welty Centennial (April 2009), pp. 35-58 The Johns Hopkins University Press https://www.jstor.org/stable/26477305
- Marrs, Suzanne. 2005. Eudora Welty: A Biography. Harvest Books, Orlando, Florida. ISBN 978-0-15-603063-2 (paperback)
- Welty, Eudora. 1941. A Curtain of Green. Doubleday, New York. OCLC 794401
- Welty, Eudora. 2001. The Collected Stories of Eudora Welty. Barnes & Noble Modern Classics edition. ISBN 0-7607-2409-1
