= Kentucky literature =

Kentucky literature did not become well known until the late 19th century, when authors such as James Lane Allen, John Fox, Jr., Alice Hegan Rice, and Annie Fellows Johnston brought light to the state's rich history and culture. As their literary works grew in popularity around the country and world, others began to take notice of all types of Kentucky literature, including works of fiction, nonfiction, poetry and the historical novel.

== History ==
=== Earlier literature ===
Literature in Kentucky developed thanks to the arrival of the printing press in Lexington in 1787. The earliest writings were folk tales, autobiographies, poetry, and historical reporting books.

For example, the Reverend Stephen T. Badin, from France in 1792, was one of the first Kentuckians to write a poem about a Kentucky hero. His elegy to Joseph Hamilton Daviess published in 1812 has appeared in numerous books. However, Reverend Badin did not become as well known a poet as George Dennison Prentice, from New England, who was one of the best known Kentuckian poets of the day with his poem on Mammoth Cave in 1840.

Mention should be made of The Beauchamp-Sharp Tragedy (Known as the Kentucky Tragedy in 1825), in which Kentuckian legislator Solomon P. Sharp was assassinated, as it attracted the attention of many novelists across the country. This tragic event fostered the relationship between Kentucky and literature.

An example of both an autobiography and historical reporting is a novel by William Wells Brown, an African American who was born in Montgomery County, Kentucky in 1814. He became a well-known abolitionist and wrote about his experiences as a slave in his novel Narrative of William Wells Brown, a Fugitive Slave, Written by Himself in 1847.

Towards the middle of the 19th century, two storybooks based on the tradition of the pioneer era were published. One is "The Hunter-Naturalist, or Wild Scenes and Wild Hunters," (1852), by Charles W. Weber. This book has been one of Kentucky's best known books for folk tales.

In 1847, Theodore O'Hara, who was born in Danville, wrote one of America's best elegies.

Regarding historical literature, the History of Kentucky was published in 1847 by Lewis Collins, and later expanded in 1874 by his son Richard Henry Collins. This work is a mine of personal, political and general facts related to the history of Kentucky which has been beneficial to those interested in learning about local or state history.

=== Golden age ===
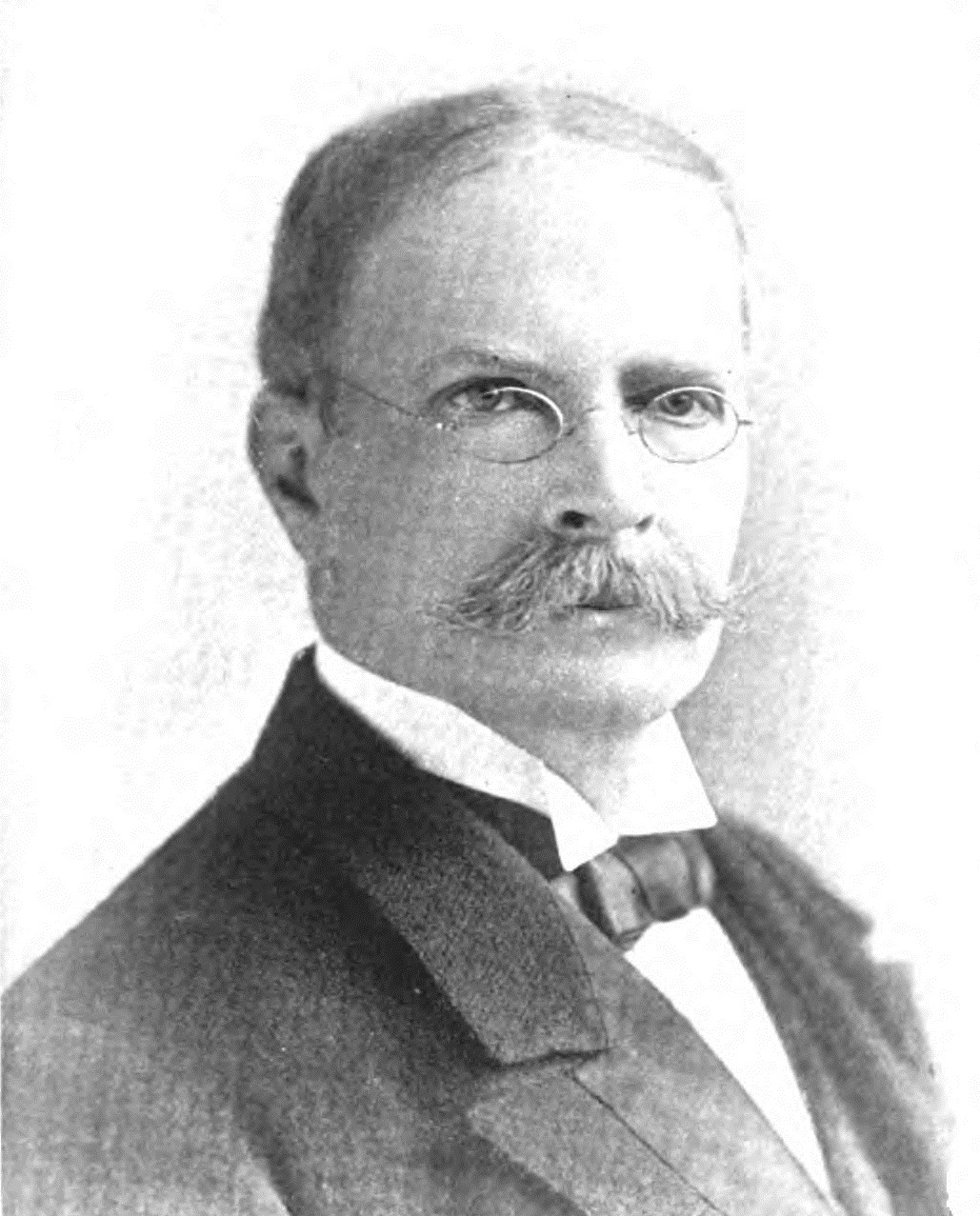
James Lane Allen

Beginning in 1885, the history of Kentucky literature began to change and become remarkable, since until this date there were no notable events at a higher level than the state level. However, in 1897 James Lane Allen published "The Invisible Choir", making him the first writer from Kentucky to appear in the top ten on the national best-seller list. Allen was a strict and formal man, preferring earlier ideas to the new way of doing things ushered in after the Civil War. He wrote about the frontier and chivalry. This revelation produced a change in the thinking of Kentucky writers, and in this way, Kentuckians would get to appear 14 times among the 10 best-selling books of the year in the United States before the year 1913. John Fox Jr. was one of famous Kentucky authors. Fox and Allen were very different, Allen's work was about Central Bluegrass and Fox's work was about the Kentucky mountains. Although they wrote in different styles, both were well-known Kentucky authors, and Fox's two most famous books were The Little Shepherd of Kingdom Come and The Trail of the Lonesome Pine.

All these changes were possible thanks to the literary trend that made Kentucky writers find a style in which to excel. In the late 1870s, Bret Harte began to give a new dimension to the literary form which reached its peak in 1880. This new point of view caused the local color movement to flourish in Kentucky, which found the style known as fiction-short fiction. This was the moment when James Lane Allen came on the scene and managed to draw attention to the Bluegrass region with his magazine articles and his contributions to local-color critical theory. Following James Lane Allen, authors such as John Fox Jr. and Alice Hegan Rice joined the movement, working together to achieve a literary boom in Kentucky and across the nation.

Additionally, magazine editors such as Edward Bok, Frank Munsey, and George Horace Lorimer brought a revolution in magazine publishing through their enthusiasm. The number of pages available for author editing increased, authors' salaries increased considerably, and new authors and authors from different parts of the world were sought to increase the diversity of publications. Additionally, lower subscription prices, better technology, and increased publicity made the Kentucky public much more interested in reading, as it became easier to access these publications. In the 1890s, the revival of historical fiction also contributed to the growth of Kentucky's literary output.

In the cities of Kentucky there were different groups of writing and reading books. However, it is necessary to mention the Authors Club of Louisville. This club brought together entities such as Alice Hegan Rice, Annie Fellows Johnston or Madison Cawein (the first nationally known poet of Kentucky). The club was founded in 1898, and in 1909 it brought together 7 important authors who commented on their own work and relied on their colleagues to be their best. Before the group disbanded, they had published more than seventy books, many articles, stories, and poems that appeared in major Kentucky magazines. Between 1902 and 1907 their novels appeared on the nation's top ten best-selling list up to five times, two of them No. 1.

After this golden age, literature in Kentucky drastically moderated; however, authors like Virginia Cary Hudson have managed to be a sensation among the country's best-sellers in 1962 with her book "O Ye Jigs and Juleps!" Elizabeth Madox Roberts was once considered the greatest American writer of the 20th century. Unlike the early Kentucky writers, Robert's work featured poor women. Many subsequent Kentucky writers followed her, and succeeded. Among Kentucky's most famous writers of the late 20th century were Jesse Stewart and Robert Penn Warren. Warren wrote fiction and poetry and became the first poet laureate of the United States. Most of Warren's works were fiction and poetry, and Warren had been called "the first poet laureate of the United States. Most of Warren's famous books were about Kentucky, and they were "Night Rider(1939)", "World Enough and Time (1950)", "Brother to Dragons(1953)", and "The Cave(1959)".

=== Modern writers ===
A number of modern Kentucky writers have graduated from the University of Kentucky: James Baker Hall of Lexington, Gurney Norman of Perry County, Ed McClanahan of Bracken County, John Egerton who lived in Cadiz, Kentucky, Bobbie Ann Mason, and Wendell Berry. Known as the greatest contemporary Kentucky writer, Wendell Berry made his name by writing essays about the world around us. Berry neither believed that the past was perfect nor agrees that all new things were good. Berry called on humanity to protect the planet because he believes that humanity's place on earth was temporary. There were many other fine Kentucky authors who covered numerous topics and in many different forms, such as Sue Grafton, who pens best-selling mystery novels. Berry was best known for his work on "The Memory of Old Jack (1974)."

In 1991, Frank Walker and other writers associated with the University of Kentucky established the Affrilachian Poets collective. Founding members of the collective included Nikky Finney, Crystal Wilkinson and Kelly Norman Ellis. The collective's works were collected in Black Bone: 25 Years of Affrilachian Poets, edited by Bianca Lynne Spriggs and Jeremy Paden.

== See also ==
- Category:Writers from Kentucky
- List of newspapers in Kentucky
- Category:Kentucky in fiction
- Category:Libraries in Kentucky
- Southern United States literature
- American literary regionalism
- Kentucky Writers Hall of Fame

== Bibliography ==
- Lucian Lamar Knight, ed. (1913). "Fifty Reading Courses: Kentucky". Library of Southern Literature. Vol. 16. Atlanta: Martin and Hoyt Company. p. 191. hdl:2027/uc1.31175034925258 – via HathiTrust.
- Elsie Dershem (1921). "Kentucky". Outline of American State Literature. Lawrence, Kansas: World Company – via Internet Archive.
- Federal Writers' Project (1939), "The Arts: Literature", Kentucky, American Guide Series, New York: Harcourt, Brace and Company, pp. 121–125, OCLC 498232 – via Internet Archive
- G. Thomas Tanselle (1971). Guide to the Study of United States Imprints. Harvard University Press. ISBN 978-0-674-36761-6. (Includes information about Kentucky literature)
- David Burg (1992). "Literature". In John E. Kleber (ed.). Kentucky Encyclopedia. University Press of Kentucky. pp. 560–562. ISBN 0-8131-2883-8.
- Jane Gentry Vance (2001). "Literature of Kentucky". In Joseph M. Flora; Lucinda Hardwick MacKethan (eds.). Companion to Southern Literature: Themes, Genres, Places, People, Movements, and Motifs. Louisiana State University Press. pp. 396–403. ISBN 978-0-8071-2692-9.
- Rothert, Otto A. (1913). "Kentucky Literature". Local History in Kentucky Literature. Louisville, Kentucky: World Company – via Internet Archive.
- Ward, William S. (1985). "Anni Mirabiles: Kentucky Literature at the Turn of the Century". The Kentucky Review. Vol. 5, no. 3. Louisville, Kentucky: World Company. Article 4 – via Internet Archive.
