= A Worn Path =

- Short story by Eudora Welty
- 1991 publication
- Country: United States
- Language: English

Publication
- Published in: The Atlantic Monthly
- Publication type: Magazine
- Media type: Short story
- Publication date: February 1941

"A Worn Path" is a short story by Eudora Welty first published in The Atlantic Monthly (February 1941). It is about an elderly African American woman who undertakes a familiar journey on a road in a rural area to acquire medicine for her grandson. She expresses herself, both to her surroundings and in short spurts of spoken monologue, warning away animals and expressing the pain she feels in her weary bones.

== Plot ==
"A Worn Path" is told in the third person point of view. "A Worn Path" follows an elderly African American woman named Phoenix Jackson as she ventures toward a town. The story is set in Natchez, Mississippi during the Great Depression era. As Phoenix journeys along the Natchez Trace, she periodically encounters many obstacles, including thorny bushes, barbed wire, and a large dog, among others. She meets a hunter, pocketing a nickel that he drops, and a lady who ties her shoes. The story concludes with Phoenix arriving at the town having completed the journey yet again. Her motivation for having done so is also revealed as she laments how her grandson swallowed lye damaging his throat from the reaction. She tells the nurse supplying the medicine that the damage to his throat never fully heals, and every so often his throat will begin to swell shut. It is Old Phoenix's love for her grandson that causes her to face the trial of the journey to town, every time it is necessary, with no questions asked.

== Character ==
The character of Phoenix Jackson is an elderly African American woman who uses a thin small cane made from an umbrella to tap the ground, akin to a white cane. Elaine Orr identifies Phoenix as a fabulist who has "a penchant for re-creation (making up stories) rather than resolution." She has also been identified as "a completely and beautifully harmonious person" and Nancy K. Butterworth has noted that the character is neither a stereotype or stock character.

== Themes ==
A commonly cited theme of the story is unselfish love, which Orr has stated is the "charitable" view of Phoenix that the white community in the text finds acceptable".

The short story also discusses racism and the arrogance it breeds by marginalizing other people and being cruel to them. However, another theme of the story is the ability of the human spirit to endure conflict and poor circumstances within nature and society out of devotion to loved ones.

== Symbolism ==
The symbolism in the piece and the potential lessons to be learned from it are open to interpretation. Many critics have commented on the significance of the main character's name in relation to the mythology phoenix, relating to her indomitable ability to rise again and make her journey. Other writers such as Dennis Sykes and Kevin Moberly have argued that Phoenix's endurance through multiple obstacles emphasizes racial and economic inequalities in the Deep South during the Depression. Kathleen Feeley has drawn comparisons to the story of Odysseus, who faces many trials along his journey. Welty herself addressed a frequently asked question - "Is Phoenix Jackson's Grandson Really Dead?" - resolving that the role of the author is not to know all certainties of the text, only the artistic truth.

Mistletoe is seen as a symbolic item by David Piwinski, who states that the plant is affiliated with "Jesus Christ" implying how Phoenix herself Is a "Christ-like figure" who repeatedly overcomes adversity. Similarly, Piwi ski notes how mistletoe is specifically an "evergreen" which may "allude to the idea that (Phoenix) is an immortal figure". Orr states that the cycle culminates for Phoenix herself in the form of the lye/damage/obstacles representing the death that the cycle begins with while the journey and destination relate to the subsequent rebirth and that the money has meaning behind it with the nickel that she stole from the ground that the hunter dropped, can say that she find and takes what she needs when she needs it.
