= The Burning (Welty story) =

- Short story by Eudora Welty
- Country: United States
- Language: English

Publication
- Publisher: Harper's Bazaar
- Publication date: March 1951

"The Burning" is a short story by Eudora Welty originally published in Harper's Bazaar (March 1951) and first collected in The Bride of the Innisfallen and Other Stories (1955) by Harcourt Brace Jovanovich. The story is unique among Welty's fiction in that it deals directly with the American Civil War. "The Burning" won second prize in the O. Henry Awards in 1951.

== Plot ==
"The Burning" is presented from a third-person point-of-view by a reliable narrator.

The story takes place in the early summer of 1863 in Mississippi during the American Civil War. The Confederate fortress at Vicksburg has fallen to Union forces; white residents around Jackson are urged to evacuate the area by rebel General Pemberton: Union troops under General Sherman are advancing, burning civilian infrastructure and plantations.

Two mistresses, the sisters Miss Theo and Miss Myra, ignore the warning and remain at the family plantation: their eldest brother is presumed to have died in combat; their father is dead. The only white male on the premises is a younger brother, a boy.

Yankee troops arrive and plantation slaves mingle with their liberators. Two Union officers enter the house on horseback and announce an inspection to remove persons from the premises before it is set on fire. One of the men dismounts and rapes Miss Myra; Miss Theo fends off the other officer. The women are led from the house and observe its destruction; their young brother dies in the flames. Afterwards, the sisters hang themselves from a pecan tree with the assistance of their domestic slave, Delilah.

Delilah examines the ruins of the charred house and grasps that she is free. Collecting some of her mistresses' jewelry and shoes, she makes her way by foot to Jackson.

== Theme and symbolism ==
Biographer and poet Carol Ann Johnston argues that the most significant thematic event occurs after the rape of the younger sister by a Union cavalry officer and the siblings' subsequent double suicide. Unlike her white mistresses, Delilia, their domestic slave, emerges from the ordeal a self-consciously free woman; in the remains of the burnt-out ruins of the plantation house she observes herself in a damaged mirror, the wooden frame depicting two Moors holding the glass:

[A]s Delilah holds up the mirror, it reflects her face, along with Jackson in the background. The symbolism here is rich. At this moment in history, the institution of slavery—the "black men"—holds up a mirror to the South, reflecting the image of desolation and destruction that the city of Jackson represents. The nature of the antebellum South, and indeed the entire country, was reflected in the way it treated slaves.

Johnston points out that, whereas the white Southern Belles fail to endure their trauma, Delilah, "suffering the ultimate restriction of slavery, survives."

Biographer Suzanne Marrs regards "The Burning" as Welty's most "Faulknerian" story. Marrs reminds readers that the setting for this Gothic tale is not typical of Welty, yet her thematic concerns remain:

More often her stories center on the rituals of southern small-town life—its piano recitals, weddings, funerals...even as they transcend a regional focus. They confront questions of love and death, passion and repression, tolerance and bigotry...suggest[ing] that life's terrors lie close at hand, not in the distant past or an exceptional event.

== Sources ==
- Johnston, Carol Ann. 1997. Eudora Welty: A Study of the Short Fiction. Twayne Publishers, New York. Gordon Weaver, general editor. ISBN 0-8057-7936-1
- Marrs, Suzanne. 2005. Eudora Welty: A Biography. Harvest Books, Orlando, Florida. ISBN 978-0-15-603063-2 (paperback)
- Welty, Eudora. 1955. The Bride of the Innisfallen and Other Stories. Harcourt Brace Jovanovich, New York. OCLC 465871628
- Welty, Eudora. 2001. The Collected Stories of Eudora Welta. Barnes & Noble Modern Classics edition. pp. 482-494. ISBN 0-7607-2409-1
