= The Optimist's Daughter =

1972 novel by Eudora Welty

- First edition
- Author: Eudora Welty
- Language: English
- Publisher: Random House
- Publication date: 1972
- Publication place: United States
- Media type: Print (hardback & paperback)
- Pages: 208 pp
- ISBN: 0-394-48017-1

The Optimist's Daughter is a 1972 novella by Eudora Welty. It was first published as a long story in The New Yorker in March 1969 and was subsequently revised and published in book form in 1972. It won that year's Pulitzer Prize for Fiction.

It concerns a woman named Laurel, who travels to her hometown, Mount Salus, to take care of her father, Judge McKelva, after his surgery for a detached retina.

== Plot ==
Laurel Hand travels to New Orleans from her home in Chicago to assist her aging father Clint, a judge, as a family friend and doctor operates on his eye. Clint remains in the hospital for recovery for several months. During this time, Laurel begins to get to know her stepmother Fay better, as she rarely visited her father since the two married. Fay begins to show her true self as Clint's condition worsens. Clint dies after his wife throws a violently emotional fit in the hospital.

The two women travel back to the family home in Mount Salus, Mississippi, for the funeral and are received by close friends of the family. Laurel finds love and friendship in a community which she left after childhood. The warmth of the town clashes with Fay's dissenting and antagonistic personality. Fay, a Texan who claimed to have no family other than her husband, is soon confronted by her past as her mother, siblings, and other members of her family show up to her house to attend the funeral. Though she confronts Fay as to the reason why she lied, Laurel only pities her. Immediately after Clint's funeral, Fay returns to Texas with her family.

With Fay gone, Laurel finally has time to herself in the house where she was raised, with the friends and neighbors she knew since childhood. During the few days she remains, Laurel digs through the past as she goes through the house, remembering her deceased parents and the life she had before she left Mount Salus. She rediscovers the life of friendship and love that she left behind, as well as heartache.

Her visit to her hometown and the memories of her parents open up a new insight on life for Laurel. She comes to a place of understanding that Fay can never share and she leaves small town Mississippi.

== Setting ==
The Optimist's Daughter begins in New Orleans, Louisiana. The beginning of the novel takes place in a hospital in the bustling city during Mardi Gras. After Clint dies, the majority of the novel is set in Laurel's childhood home, in her father's hometown of Mount Salus, Mississippi.

== Symbolism ==
The most prominent metaphor in The Optimist's Daughter is vision. Welty equates the ability to see with the ability to understand. Both of Laurel's parents suffered from failures of vision. Her mother, Becky McKelva slowly loses her vision as she approaches her death, and her father dies while attempting to recover from surgery for a detached retina. Additional images of vision persist throughout the novel. It not only contains several characters who suffer from blindness or poor vision but also images of vision or the lack of vision. Laurel is constantly noticing curtains, blinds, glasses, and windows. These remind her of her need to understand her present situation and the lack of understanding she has for her stepmother, Fay. Although not physically blind, Fay has poor vision in that she lacks the maturity to understand as is evidenced by her insensitivity towards others.
