= The Bride of the Innisfallen and Other Stories =

- First edition cover
- Language: English
- Genre: Short story collection
- Publisher: Harcourt Brace Jovanovich
- Publication date: 1955
- Publication place: United States
- Media type: Print (hardback)
- Pages: 207
- OCLC: 465871628

The Bride of Innisfallen and Other Stories is a collection of short fiction by Eudora Welty published in 1955 by Harcourt, Brace Jovanovich. Welty's fourth volume of short stories, it was her last collection before the collected and uncollected short fiction appeared in The Collected Stories of Eudora Welty (1980).

== Stories ==
- "No Place for You, My Love" (The New Yorker, September 20, 1952)
- "The Burning" (Harper's Bazaar, March 1951)
- "The Bride of the Innisfallen" (The New Yorker, December 1, 1951)
- "Ladies in Spring" (The Sewanee Review, Winter 1954, as "Spring")
- "Circe" (Ascent, Fall 1949, as "Put Me in the Sky!")
- "Kin" (The New Yorker, November 15, 1952)
- "Going to Naples" (Harper's Bazaar, July 1954)

== Reception ==
"In The Bride of the Innisfallen, Eudora Welty thus surely anticipates the issues upon which critics of the 1980s and 1990s have focused, but she does so in a way far richer and far more hopeful than we have come to expect in contemporary literature."—Biographer Suzanne Marrs in The Mississippi Quarterly, Fall 1997.

The critical response to the collection varied widely. Critic Orville Prescott at the New York Times disparaged the collection:

From Elizabeth Bowen Welty seems to have acquired her taste for ambiguity, her way of hinting evasively while withholding essential information, her habit of circling around the point of a story without bothering to reveal it. From William Faulkner she seems to have learned the questionable device of narrating a story from the point of view of a mentally incompetent observer and to have derived her pleasure in grotesque horrors.

The same influence exerted by Bowen detected and disparaged by Prescott met with approval by critic Francis Gaither at the New York Review of Books: "Miss Welty's talents, invested in these foreign ventures, have suffered no adverse sea-change."

Saturday Review Syndicate reviewer John Barkman provided fulsome approval for the collection:

The new volume contains only seven tales, but they exhibit both her infallible ear (which Katherine Anne Porter has called "pure as a tuning fork") and her power to register a sensitive awareness of people and places.

== Theme ==
Ruth D. Weston in The Southern Literary Journal calls these stories "the most enigmatic" among Welty's collections.

The thematic tension between promiscuity or daring and chastity or emotional reticence in Welty's fiction is undergirded by the tension between two seemingly contradictory aesthetic principles, one of which she has described as the imagination's "power to reveal, with nothing barred" and the other as narrative "reticence."

According to biographer Suzanne Marrs, Welty "disoritented" critics when she set over half the stories in the collection outside of Welty's native Mississippi. The loss of a "sense of place" that characterized all of her earlier stories "may be the key reason they so bewildered Welty's readers" In these tales, Welty no longer asserts that locale "is essential to identity." Rather, "she deals with the way individuals can live and create meaning for themselves without being rooted in place and time. In particular, she focuses upon the nature of women's identities as they exist apart from any defining place. As such, The Bride of the Innisfallen reveals the author's "increased sense of self-confidence as a writer" and "a determining factor in the new patterns her stories would follow."

== Sources ==
- Johnston, Carol Ann. 1997. Eudora Welty: A Study of the Short Fiction. Twayne Publishers, New York. Gordon Weaver, general editor. ISBN 0-8057-7936-1
- Marrs, Suzanne. 1997. "Place and the Displaced in Eudora Welty's "The Bride of the Innisfallen. The Mississippi Quarterly, Fall 1997, Vol. 50, No. 4, Special Issue: Eudora Welty (Fall 1997), pp. 647-668. The Johns Hopkins University Press. https://www.jstor.org/stable/26476902 Accessed October 3, 2025.
- Marrs, Suzanne. 2005. Eudora Welty: A Biography. Harvest Books, Orlando, Florida. ISBN 978-0-15-603063-2 (paperback)
- Welty, Eudora. 2001. The Collected Stories of Eudora Welty. Barnes & Noble Modern Classics edition. ISBN 0-7607-2409-1
- Welty, Eudora. 1955. The Bride of the Innisfallen and Other Stories. Harcourt Brace Jovanovich, New York. OCLC 465871628
- Weston, Ruth D. 2000. Reticent Beauty and Promiscuous Joy: Textual Framing in Eudora Welty's "The Bride of the Innisfallen and Other Stories" The Southern Literary Journal , Spring, 2000, Vol. 32, No. 2 (Spring, 2000), pp. 42–58 Published by: University of North Carolina Press https://www.jstor.org/stable/20078266
