= Losing Battles =

1970 novel by Eudora Welty

Losing Battles: A Novel
- Publisher: Harcourt Brace
- Publication date: 1970
- Media type: Print (hardback)
- ISBN: 9789000001590

Losing Battles: A Novel is the last novel by Eudora Welty. It was released on April 13, 1970. Its setting is two days—a Sunday and Monday morning—in a 1930s farm in Mississippi. It was her first novel to make the best seller lists, to Welty's surprise.

== Development ==
Welty wrote the novel as a challenge to herself. In an interview for The Paris Review, she said:

I wanted to see if I could do something that was new for me: translating every thought and feeling into action and speech, speech being another form of action—to bring the whole life of it off through the completed gesture, so to speak. I felt that I’d been writing too much by way of description, of introspection on the part of my characters. I tried to see if I could make everything shown, brought forth, without benefit of the author’s telling any more about what was going on inside the characters’ minds and hearts. For me, this makes almost certainly for comedy—which I love to write best of all. Now I see it might be a transition toward writing a play.

Welty set the novel in the 1930s because she wanted to write about "a family who had nothing" and the Depression provided that opportunity. Originally, she had not planned to write a novel; in the Paris Review interview she said, "I’m a short-story writer who writes novels the hard way, and by accident".

The novel's first edition was published on Welty's 61st birthday.

== Reception ==
The novel's reception was generally very positive, with many critics praising its "geniality and humour". New York Times reviewer and academic James Boatwright gave strong praise, calling it "a beautiful and valuable novel" which had an "overwhelming effect [that] is comic—lyrical and touching." Joyce Carol Oates was not as enthusiastic, describing it as "entertainment", and less successful at probing the characters' "psychological concerns". Scholar Larry J. Reynolds challenged that assessment, noting that "beneath its entertaining surface [is an] intense struggle for survival [...] subtly and carefully told."
