= Dearth of a Salesman =

Dearth of a Salesman may refer to:

- Dearth of a Salesman (film), 1957 short film co-written by and starring Peter Sellers
- "Dearth of a Salesman" (Coogan's Run), a 1995 television episode

== See also ==
- Death of a Salesman (disambiguation)
