= Southern Renaissance =

Reinvigoration of Southern US literature in the 1920s–30s

The Southern Renaissance (also known as Southern Renascence) was the reinvigoration of American Southern literature in the 1920s and 1930s with the appearance of writers such as William Faulkner, Thomas Wolfe, Caroline Gordon, Margaret Mitchell, Katherine Anne Porter, Erskine Caldwell, Allen Tate, Tennessee Williams, Robert Penn Warren, and Zora Neale Hurston, among others.

== Overview ==
Prior to this renaissance, white Southern writers tended to focus on historical romances about the "Lost Cause" of the Confederate States of America. This writing glorified the heroism of the Confederate army and civilian population during the Civil War and the supposedly idyllic culture that existed in the South before the war (known as the Antebellum South).

The belief in the heroism and morality of the South's "Lost Cause" was a driving force in Southern literature between the Civil War and World War I. The Southern Renaissance changed this by addressing three major themes in their works. The first was the burden of history in a place where many people still remembered slavery, Reconstruction, and a devastating military defeat. The second theme was to focus on the South's conservative culture, specifically on how an individual could exist without losing a sense of identity in a region where family, religion, and community were more highly valued than one's personal and social life. The final theme that the renaissance writers approached was the South's troubled history in regards to racial issues. Because of these writers' distance from the Civil War and slavery, they were able to bring more objectivity to writings about the South. They also brought new modernistic techniques such as stream of consciousness and complex narrative techniques to their works (as Faulkner did in his novel As I Lay Dying).

Among the writers of the Southern Renaissance, William Faulkner is arguably the most influential and famous. He won the Nobel Prize in Literature in 1949.

== The emergence of a new critical spirit ==
The Southern Renaissance in the 1920s had been preceded by a long period after the Civil War during which Southern literature was dominated by writers who supported the Lost Cause. Yet the critical spirit that characterized the Southern Renaissance did have roots in the era that preceded it.

From the 1880s onwards, a few white Southern authors, such as George Washington Cable and Mark Twain (considered a Southern writer because he grew up in the slave state of Missouri and set many of his writings in the South) challenged readers by pointing out the exploitation of blacks and ridiculing other Southern conventions of the time.

In the 1890s, the writings of journalist Walter Hines Page and academics William Peterfield Trent and John Spencer Bassett severely criticized the cultural and intellectual mediocrity of the men who held power in the South. In 1903, Basset, an academic at Trinity College (later Duke University) angered many influential white Southerners when he called African-American leader Booker T. Washington "the greatest man, save General Lee, born in the South in a hundred years."

The most comprehensive and outspoken criticisms directed against the tenets of the "Lost Cause" before the First World War were put forth by African-American writers who grew up in the South, most famously by Charles W. Chesnutt in his novels The House Behind the Cedars (1900) and The Marrow of Tradition (1901). However, before the 1970s, African-American authors from the South were not considered part of Southern literature by the white and mostly male authors and critics who considered themselves the main creators and guardians of the Southern literary tradition.

The Southern Renaissance was the first significant literary movement in the Southern United States that responded to longstanding critiques of the region's intellectual and cultural stagnation. These critiques came from both within the Southern literary tradition and from external commentators, most notably H. L. Mencken. In his 1917 essay "The Sahara of the Bozart," Mencken famously criticized the South as the most intellectually barren region in the U.S., asserting that its cultural life had been in decline since the Civil War. The Southern Renaissance sought to counter these views. This created a storm of protest from within conservative circles in the South. However, many emerging Southern writers who were already highly critical of contemporary life in the South were emboldened by Mencken's essay. On the other hand, Mencken's subsequent bitter attacks on aspects of Southern culture that they valued amazed and horrified them. In response to the attacks of Mencken and his imitators, Southern writers were provoked to a reassertion of Southern uniqueness and a deeper exploration of the theme of Southern identity.

== The Fugitives ==
The start of the Southern Renaissance is often traced back to the activities of "The Fugitives", a group of poets and critics who were based at Vanderbilt University in Nashville, Tennessee, just after the First World War. The group included John Crowe Ransom, Donald Davidson, Allen Tate, Robert Penn Warren, Laura Riding and others. Together they created the magazine The Fugitive (1922–1925), so named because the editors announced that they fled "from nothing faster than from the high-caste Brahmins of the Old South."

== The Southern Agrarians ==
The emergence of the Southern Renaissance as a literary and cultural movement has also been seen as a consequence of the opening up of the predominantly rural South to outside influences due to the industrial expansion that took place in the region during and after the First World War. Southern opposition to industrialization was expressed in the famous essay collection I'll Take My Stand: The South and the Agrarian Tradition (1930), written by authors and critics from the Southern Renaissance who came to be known as Southern Agrarians.

== Legacy ==
Many Southern writers of the 1940s, '50s, and '60s were inspired by the writers of the Southern Renaissance, including Reynolds Price, James Dickey, Walker Percy, Eudora Welty, Flannery O'Connor, John Kennedy Toole, Carson McCullers, and Harper Lee (whose novel To Kill a Mockingbird won the Pulitzer Prize in 1961), along with many others.

== See also ==
- African-American literature
- Southern Gothic
- Southern literature
