= The Demonstrators =

- Short story by Eudora Welty
- Country: United States
- Language: English

Publication
- Publisher: The New Yorker
- Publication date: November 19, 1966

"The Demonstrators" is a short story by Eudora Welty, originally published in The New Yorker (November 19, 1966) and collected in The Collected Stories of Eudora Welty (1980) by Harcourt Brace Jovanovich. The story won the First Prize O. Henry Award for 1968.

== Plot ==
"The Demonstrators" is presented from a third-person point-of-view by a reliable narrator. The story is set in the fictional Holden, a town in Mississippi impacted by the Civil Rights movement of the 1960s. Events concerning the protests and civil unrest during the period are alluded to, but no demonstrations or police repression appear in the story.

Dr. Richard Strickland M.D. is a white physician, and like his father before him, the only doctor serving the black community in Holden. He is separated from his wife, Irene, after the death of their mentally disabled 13-year-old daughter. Dr. Strickland is limited to socializing with the white professional establishment.

Summoned to a house in the Negro section of town he discovers a 21-year-old black maid, Ruby Gaddy, grievously wounded. Local black residents reveal she has been stabbed with an ice pick as she left church by her common law husband, David "Dorr" Collins. Witnesses say that in the struggle, Ruby seized the weapon and attacked Dorr; each succumb to their wounds that night. The circumstances leading up to the homicides are never explained.

The elderly and bedridden former local school teacher, Miss Marcia Pope, who Strickland treats for her chronic conditions, is the only character who appears to emerge unscathed in the story: "He thought that in all Holden, as of now, Miss Marcia Pope was still quite able to take care of herself or so was her own opinion."

== Background ==
"It is an outstanding characteristic of Miss Welty's genius that she can write a story that seems to me, in a way, about 'nothing'—Flaubert's ideal, a masterpiece of style—and make it mean very nearly everything."—Joyce Carol Oates on Welty's short story "The Demonstrators" (1966).

In 1965 Welty accepted a position as writer-in-residence at Millsaps College. At the time, she was caring for her ailing mother, Chestina, and for her brother, Edward, who had fallen and injured his neck; each died days apart in 1966.

"The Demonstrators" was written during the height of the Civil Rights Movement. Biographer Suzanne Marrs writes:

Frustration with the ingrained racism that dominated Mississippi, frustrations with the tensions that often overwhelmed daily life in the sixties, relief that needed change was finally coming about, regret that reasoned discussion had been replaced by loud and violent confrontations—all this sparked the story.

Welty submitted the story to her longtime agent Diarmuid Russell in November, who offered it to William Maxwell at The New Yorker. The piece appeared in their November 26, 1966 edition. Upon its publication, Welty read the work to the National Council of Teachers of English in Houston, Texas.

== Critical appraisal ==
According to author Joyce Carol Oates, the story "resists analysis."

"The Demonstrators" is a small masterpiece of subtlety, of gentleness—a real gentleness of tone, a reluctance to exaggerate or even to highlight drama, as if sensing such gestures alien to life. We are left with an unforgettable sense of the permanence and impermanence of life, and especially of the confused web of human relationships that constitute most of our lives.

== Sources ==
- Johnston, Carol Ann. 1997. Eudora Welty: A Study of the Short Fiction. Twayne Publishers, New York. Gordon Weaver, general editor. ISBN 0-8057-7936-1
- Oates, Joyce Carol. 1969. In Shenandoah, Washington and Lee University Review, Spring 1969 in Eudora Welty: A Study of the Short Fiction. pp. 169-172. Twayne Publishers, New York. Gordon Weaver, general editor. ISBN 0-8057-7936-1
- Welty, Eudora. 2001. The Collected Stories of Eudora Welty. Barnes & Noble Modern Classics edition. ISBN 0-7607-2409-1
