= One Writer's Beginnings =

Collection of essays by Eudora Welty

- First edition
- Author: Eudora Welty
- Language: English
- Publisher: Harvard University Press
- Publication date: 1984
- Publication place: United States
- ISBN: 0-674-63925-1

One Writer's Beginnings is a collection of autobiographical essays by Eudora Welty. The book is based on three lectures she delivered at Harvard University in April 1983, as part of the William E. Massey Sr. lecture series. The three essays are entitled: Listening, Learning to See, and Finding a Voice. Well received by both critics and fans alike, One Writer's Beginnings was on The New York Times bestseller list for almost a year.

In the essays, Ms. Welty explains the inescapable bond between her childhood in Mississippi and her later career as a writer. She shares details from her childhood and her relationship with her parents, Christian Welty and Chestina Andrews Welty. She discusses how these two critical relationships, and other relationships from her childhood, contributed to her literary voice. The book has been praised as revealing "the confluence of past and present as the design of Welty's life and art by making such intersection the structural principle behind her life story as an artist."

The book includes a number of Welty family photos.

The lectures were published in book form by Harvard University Press in 1984.
