= The Golden Apples =

1949 short story collection by Eudora Welty

- First edition cover
- Publisher: Harcourt Brace Javanovich
- Publication date: 1949
- Media type: Print (hardback)
- Pages: 277
- OCLC: 290903

The Golden Apples is a short story collection written by Eudora Welty, first published in 1949. The stories form an interrelated cycle, which explores the economic and social plight of the fictional Morgana Mississippi. Author Katherine Anne Porter wrote the introduction to the volume.

The characters in Welty's stories are influenced by classical myth, myth, and rural forklore. Her appreciation of poet William Butler Yeats also informed the collection.

== Stories ==
- "Shower of Gold" (The Atlantic, May 1948)
- "June Recital" (Harper's Bazaar, September 1947, as "Golden Apples")
- "Sir Rabbit" (The Hudson Review, Spring 1949)
- "Moon Lake" (The Sewanee Review, Summer 1949)
- "The Whole World Knows" (Harper's Bazaar, March 1947)
- "Music from Spain" (limited edition by The Levee Press, June 1948)
- "The Wanderers" (Harper's Bazaar, March 1949, as "The Hummingbirds")

== Retrospective appraisal ==
Reexamining the collection in 2011, The Independent critic David Evans described the collection as evocative, "But it is her vivid evocations of nature that linger." Another 2011 review in The Guardian wrote that the collection is "brilliantly capturing the precise timbre of a fleeting moment and revealing its startling load."

Critic Pierpont, Claudia Roth reports that "the complex and deeply moving" "June Recital" was "the most personally meaningful of all her stories...which became the centerpiece" of the collection.

Literary critic Daniele Pitavy-Souques regards The Golden Apples as "the central book" in Welty's body of fiction.

== Theme ==
The stories use shared themes and other literary devices to ensure that the stories operate as a unified whole. One reviewer noted that "Allusion and metaphor hang as thick as Spanish moss in Welty's prose."

== Sources ==
- Johnston, Carol Ann. 1997. Eudora Welty: A Study of the Short Fiction. Twayne Publishers, New York. Gordon Weaver, general editor. ISBN 0-8057-7936-1
- Marrs, Suzanne. 2005. Eudora Welty: A Biography. Harvest Books, Orlando, Florida. ISBN -0-15-603063-2 (paperback)
- Pierpont, Claudia Roth. 1998. A Perfect Lady. The New Yorker, October 5, 1998. https://www.newyorker.com/magazine/1998/10/05/a-perfect-lady Accessed 22 September 2025.
- Welty, Eudora. 1949. The Golden Apples. Harcourt Brace Javonovich, New York. OCLC 290903
- Welty, Eudora. 2001. The Collected Stories of Eudora Welty. Barnes & Noble Modern Classics. ISBN 0-7607-2409-1
