= The Collected Stories of Eudora Welty =

1980 short story collection by Eudora Welty

- First edition cover
- Author: Eudora Welty
- Publisher: Harcourt Brace Jovanovich
- Publication date: January 1, 1980
- Award: National Book Award for Fiction (Paperback) (1983)
- ISBN: 9780151189946

The Collected Stories of Eudora Welty is a collection of short stories by American writer Eudora Welty, first published by Houghton Mifflin in 1980. Its first paperback edition (Harvest Books) won the 1983 National Book Award for Paperback Fiction.

Collected Stories demonstrates the author's ability to write from the point of view of diverse characters ranging from Aaron Burr to a deaf black servant boy, a traveling salesman, eccentric Southern matrons, and countless others. The volume includes a May, 1980 preface by the author.

Barnes & Noble issued a Modern Classics edition in 2001.

== Stories ==
The collection contains all of Welty's previously collected short fiction, as well as two previously uncollected works.

Collected stories:

- A Curtain of Green (1941)
- The Wide Net and Other Stories (1943)
- The Golden Apples (1949)
- The Bride of the Innisfallen and Other Stories (1955)

Uncollected stories:

- "Where is the Voice Coming From?" (The New Yorker, June 29, 1963)
- "The Demonstrators" (The New Yorker, November 19, 1966)

== Reception ==
Kirkus Reviews indicated Welty's "famous tales of Southern small-town life have only become more impressive with time," concluding that The Collected Stories are "a welcome gathering of an important writer's short fiction—some of which is her very best work of all".

== Sources ==
- Welty, Eudora. 1980. The Collected Stories of Eudora Welty. Houghton Mifflin, New York. ISBN 9780151189946
- Welty, Eudora. 2001. The Collected Stories of Eudora Welty. 2001. Barnes & Noble Modern Classics. ISBN 0-7607-2409-1
