= The Robber Bridegroom (novella) =

1942 novella by Eudora Welty

- First edition cover
- Author: Eudora Welty
- Language: English
- Publisher: Doubleday, Doran (US) & The Bodley Head (UK)
- Publication date: 1942
- Publication place: United States
- Media type: Print (Hardback & Paperback)
- Pages: 185

The Robber Bridegroom is a 1942 novella by Eudora Welty.

The story, inspired by and loosely based on the Grimm fairy tale The Robber Bridegroom, is a Southern folk tale set in Mississippi. At the opening of the novella, the legendary Mike Fink meets gentleman robber Jamie Lockhart, and Lockhart comes out on top. The story follows Clement Musgrove back to his home on the Natchez Trace, where he lives with his daughter, Rosamund, and second wife, Salome. Lockhart kidnaps Rosamund, and the two quickly fall in love.

The novel utilizes aspects of the Cupid and Psyche myth. It was adapted by Alfred Uhry and Robert Waldman into a musical of the same name in the early seventies and opened for a short run on Broadway in 1976.
