= Ellen Gilchrist =

American writer (1935–2024)

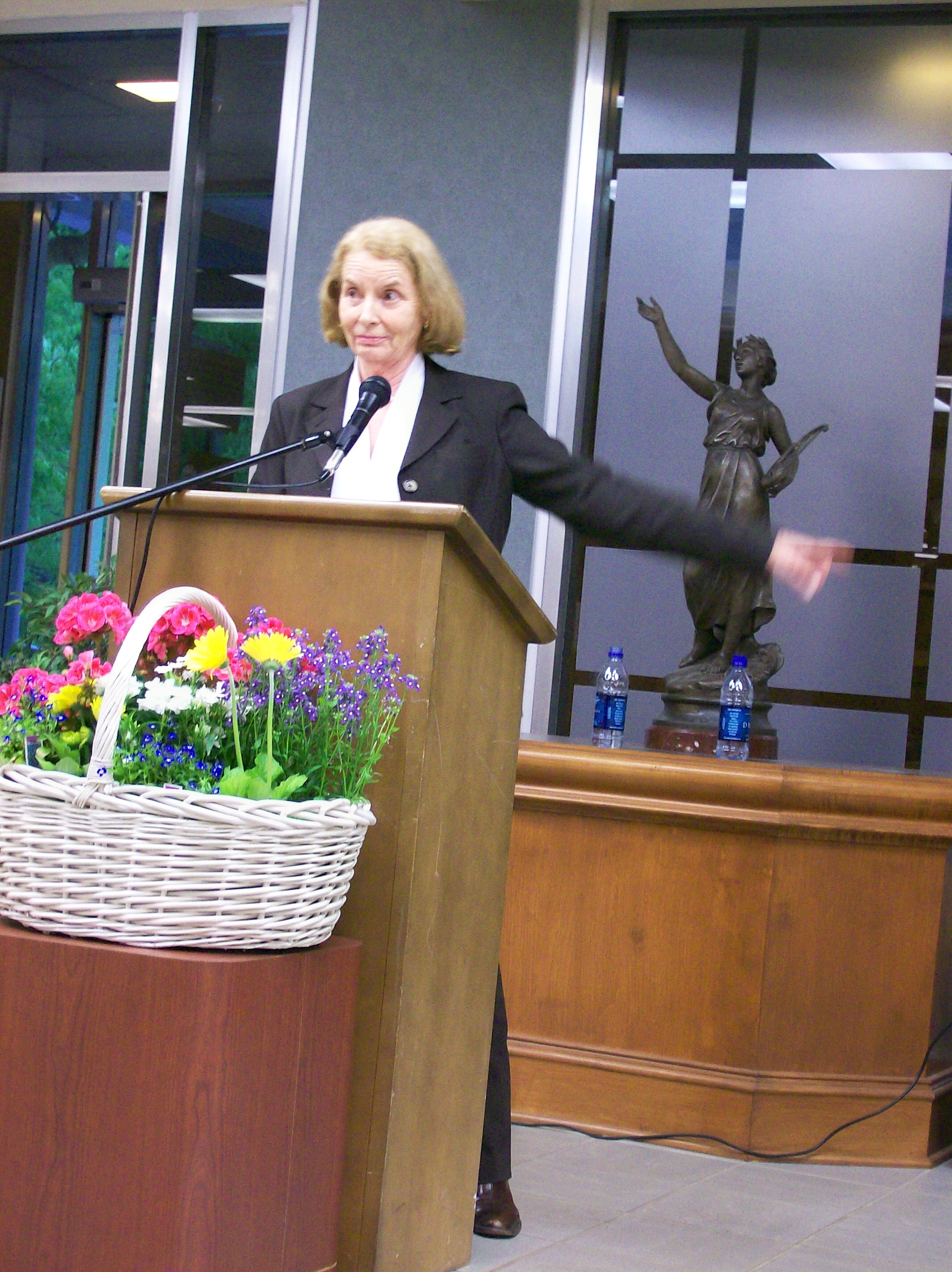
- Gilchrist at University of Montevallo in 2007
- Born: February 20, 1935; Vicksburg, Mississippi, U.S.
- Died: January 30, 2024 (aged 88); Ocean Springs, Mississippi, U.S.
- Education: Millsaps College (BA); University of Arkansas
- Occupation: Writer
- Children: 3
- Writing career
- Period: 1979–2016
- Genres: Novel, short story, poetry

Ellen Louise Gilchrist (February 20, 1935 – January 30, 2024) was an American novelist, short story writer, and poet. She won a National Book Award for her 1984 collection of short stories, Victory Over Japan.

== Life and career ==
Ellen Louise Gilchrist was born in Vicksburg, Mississippi, on February 20, 1935. She spent part of her childhood on a plantation owned by her maternal grandparents. She earned a Bachelor of Arts degree in philosophy and studied creative writing under renowned writer Eudora Welty at Millsaps College. Later in life, Gilchrist enrolled in the creative writing program at the University of Arkansas, where she received an MFA.

Gilchrist was married and divorced four times (two with the same man) and had three children from her first and third marriages to the same man. She lived in New Orleans, Louisiana, Fayetteville, Arkansas, and Ocean Springs, Mississippi. She was a professor of creative writing and contemporary fiction at the University of Arkansas for over 20 years. Her work was noted for its focus on culture and society in the South.

Gilchrist was heard regularly as a commentator on National Public Radio's Morning Edition from 1984 to 1985. Her NPR commentaries have been published in her book Falling Through Space.

Gilchrist died from breast cancer at home in Ocean Springs on the evening of January 30, 2024, at the age of 88. She was survived by her sons Pierre Gautier Walker, Marshall Peteet Walker Jr., and Garth Gilchrist Walker, as well as 18 grandchildren, 10 great grandchildren, and her brother Robert Alford Gilchrist.

== Reception ==
A success for the recently founded University of Arkansas Press, In the Land of Dreamy Dreams (1981) sold more than 10,000 copies in its first ten months and won immense critical acclaim. Victory over Japan, a collection of short stories, won the U.S. National Book Award for Fiction in 1984. Gilchrist also won awards for her poetry, although it was her short fiction for which she was most well-known. Gilchrist's stories are often praised for the characters that reappear regularly throughout her many volumes of short stories. Her final book is A Dangerous Age (Algonquin, 2008).

== Bibliography ==
=== Novels ===
- The Annunciation (1983)
- The Anna Papers (1988)
- Net of Jewels (1992)
- Starcarbon: A Meditation on Love (1994)
- Anabasis (1994)
- Sarah Conley (1997)
- A Dangerous Age (2008)

=== Story collections ===
- In the Land of Dreamy Dreams (1981)
- Victory over Japan (1984)
- Drunk with Love (1986)
- Light Can Be Both Wave and Particle (1989)
- I Cannot Get You Close Enough: Three Novellas (1990)
- The Age of Miracles (1995)
- Rhoda (1995)
- The Courts of Love (1996)
- Flights of Angels (1998)
- The Cabal (2000)
- Collected Stories (2000)
- I, Rhoda Manning, Go Hunting With My Daddy (2002)
- Nora Jane: A Life in Stories (2005)
- Acts of God (2014)

=== Other ===
- The Land Surveyor's Daughter (poetry) (1979)
- Riding out the Tropical Depression: Selected Poems, 1975-1985 (1986)
- Falling Through Space: The Journals of Ellen Gilchrist (1987)
- The Writing Life (2005)
- Things Like the Truth: Out of My Later Years (2016)
