= Music from Spain =

1948 short story by Eudora Welty

- Short story by Eudora Welty
- Limited edition cover
- Country: United States
- Language: English

Publication
- Publisher: Levee Press
- Publication date: June 1948
- Pages: 62

"Music from Spain" is a short story by Eudora Welty, published in June 1948 as a limited edition monograph by the Levee Press in Greenville, Mississippi, and as a part of the short story collection The Golden Apples in 1949.
