= Claudia Roth Pierpont =

American journalist

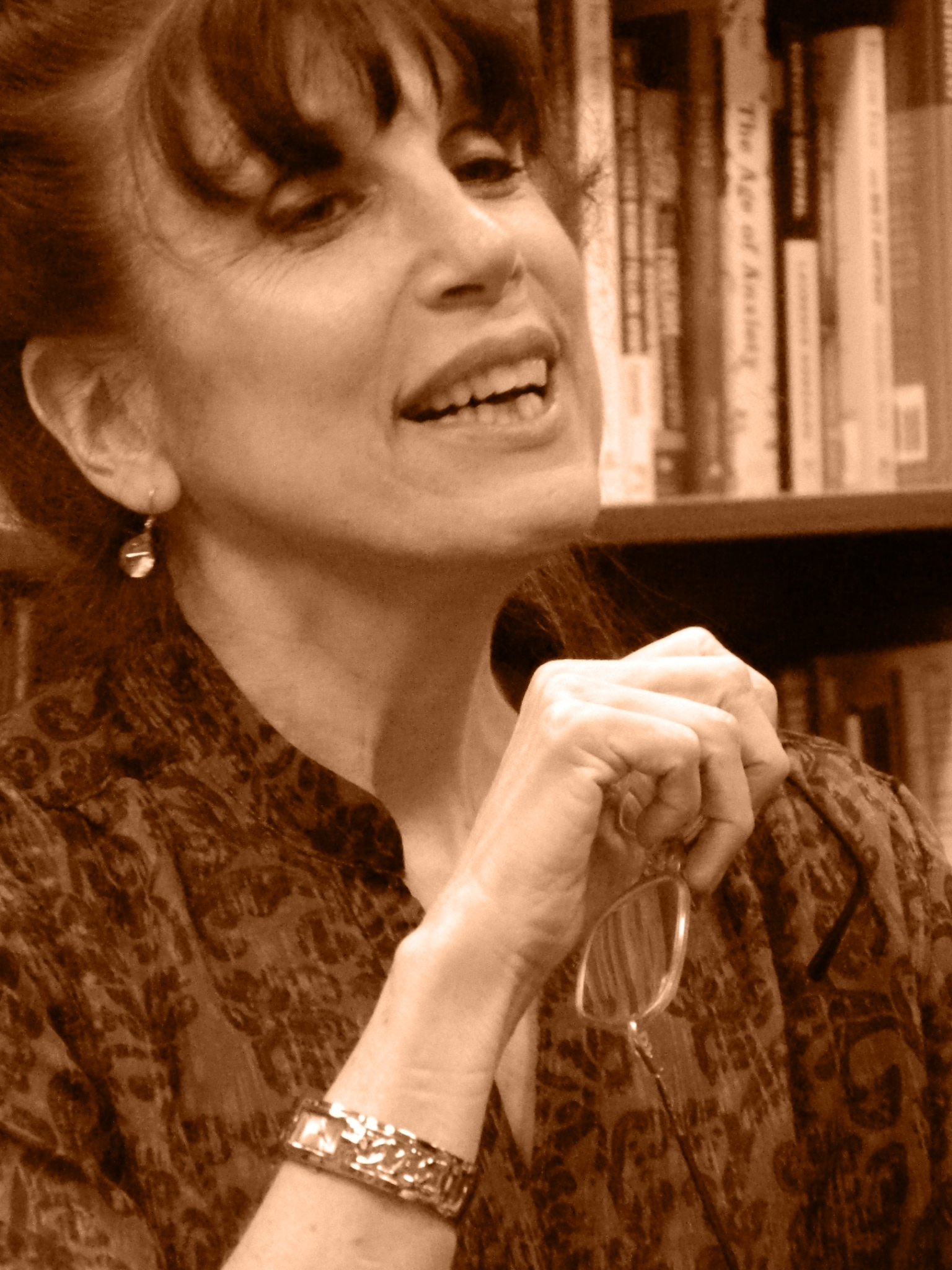
- Pierpont in New York City, 2013
- Education: Barnard College (BA); New York University (PhD)
- Occupations: Journalist; professor; writer

Claudia Roth Pierpont is an American writer and journalist. She has been a contributor to The New Yorker since 1990 and became a staff writer in 2004. Her subjects have included Friedrich Nietzsche, Katharine Hepburn, Mae West, Orson Welles, the Ballets Russes and the Chrysler Building.

A collection of eleven of Pierpont's New Yorker essays, Passionate Minds: Women Rewriting the World, was published in 2000. Nominated for a National Book Critics Circle Award, the book juxtaposes the lives and works of women writers, including Hannah Arendt, Gertrude Stein, Anaïs Nin, Ayn Rand, Margaret Mitchell and Zora Neale Hurston. Her biography of writer Philip Roth, Roth Unbound: A Writer and His Books, was published by Farrar, Straus and Giroux in October 2013 and has since been translated into several languages. Her book about the Chrysler Building, American Rhapsody: Writers, Musicians, Movie Stars, and One Great Building, was published in 2016.

Pierpont has been the recipient of a Whiting Award, a Guggenheim Fellowship and a fellowship at the Cullman Center for Scholars and Writers of the New York Public Library.

Pierpont lives in New York City. She graduated from Barnard College in 1979 and holds a Ph.D. in Italian Renaissance art history from New York University. She has been a professor of creative journalism at New York University and Columbia University.

She is the mother of author Julia Pierpont.

== Bibliography ==
- Pierpont, Claudia Roth (2000). Passionate minds : women rewriting the world. Knopf. ISBN 9780679431060.
- — (May 23, 2016). "Full exposure". The New Yorker. Vol. 92, no. 15. Portfolio by Diane Arbus. pp. 56–67.
- Roth Unbound: A Writer and His Books. (2013)
- American Rhapsody: Writers, Musicians, Movie Stars, and One Great Building. (2016)
