= Eudora Welty =

American writer and photographer (1909–2001)

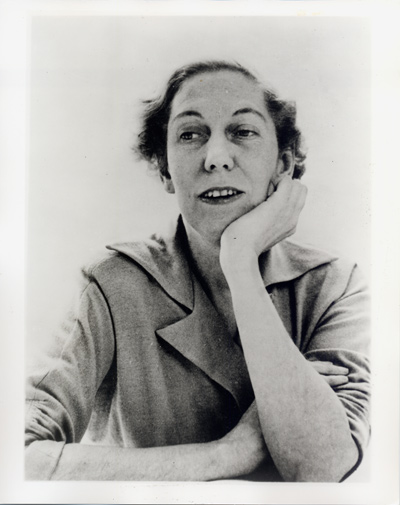
- Eudora Welty in 1962
- Born: Eudora Alice Welty; April 13, 1909; Jackson, Mississippi, U.S.
- Died: July 23, 2001 (aged 92); Jackson, Mississippi, U.S.
- Education: Mississippi University for Women; University of Wisconsin, Madison (BA); Columbia University (MA)
- Occupations: Author, photographer
- Writing career
- Notable works: The Optimist's Daughter (1972); The Collected Stories of Eudora Welty (1983)
- Notable awards: Edward MacDowell Medal; Pulitzer Prize for Fiction; National Book Award for Fiction

Eudora Alice Welty (April 13, 1909 – July 23, 2001) was an American short-story writer, novelist, and photographer who wrote about the American South. Her novel The Optimist's Daughter won the Pulitzer Prize in 1973. Welty received numerous awards, including the Presidential Medal of Freedom and the Order of the South. She was the first living author to have her works published by the Library of America. Her house in Jackson, Mississippi, has been designated as a National Historic Landmark and is open to the public as a house museum.

== Biography ==
Eudora Welty was born in Jackson, Mississippi, on April 13, 1909, the daughter of Christian Webb Welty (1879–1931) and Mary Chestina (Andrews) Welty (1883–1966). She grew up with three younger brothers: Edward Nickher Jefferson, Walter Allen Andrews and Logan Allen Howze. Her mother was a schoolteacher. Her family were members of the Methodist church. Her childhood home is still standing and was listed on the National Register of Historic Places in 1980 prior to being delisted in 1986 because a dormer and deck were added to the roof.

Welty soon developed a love of reading, reinforced by her mother, who believed that "any room in our house, at any time in the day, was there to read in, or to be read to." Her father, who worked as an insurance executive, was intrigued by gadgets and machines and inspired in Welty a love of mechanical things. She later used technology for symbolism in her stories and also became an avid photographer, like her father.

She attended Central High School in Jackson. Near the time of her high-school graduation, Welty moved with her family to a house built for them at 1119 Pinehurst Street, which remained her permanent address until her death. Wyatt C. Hedrick designed the Weltys' Tudor Revival-style home, which became known as the Eudora Welty House and Garden.

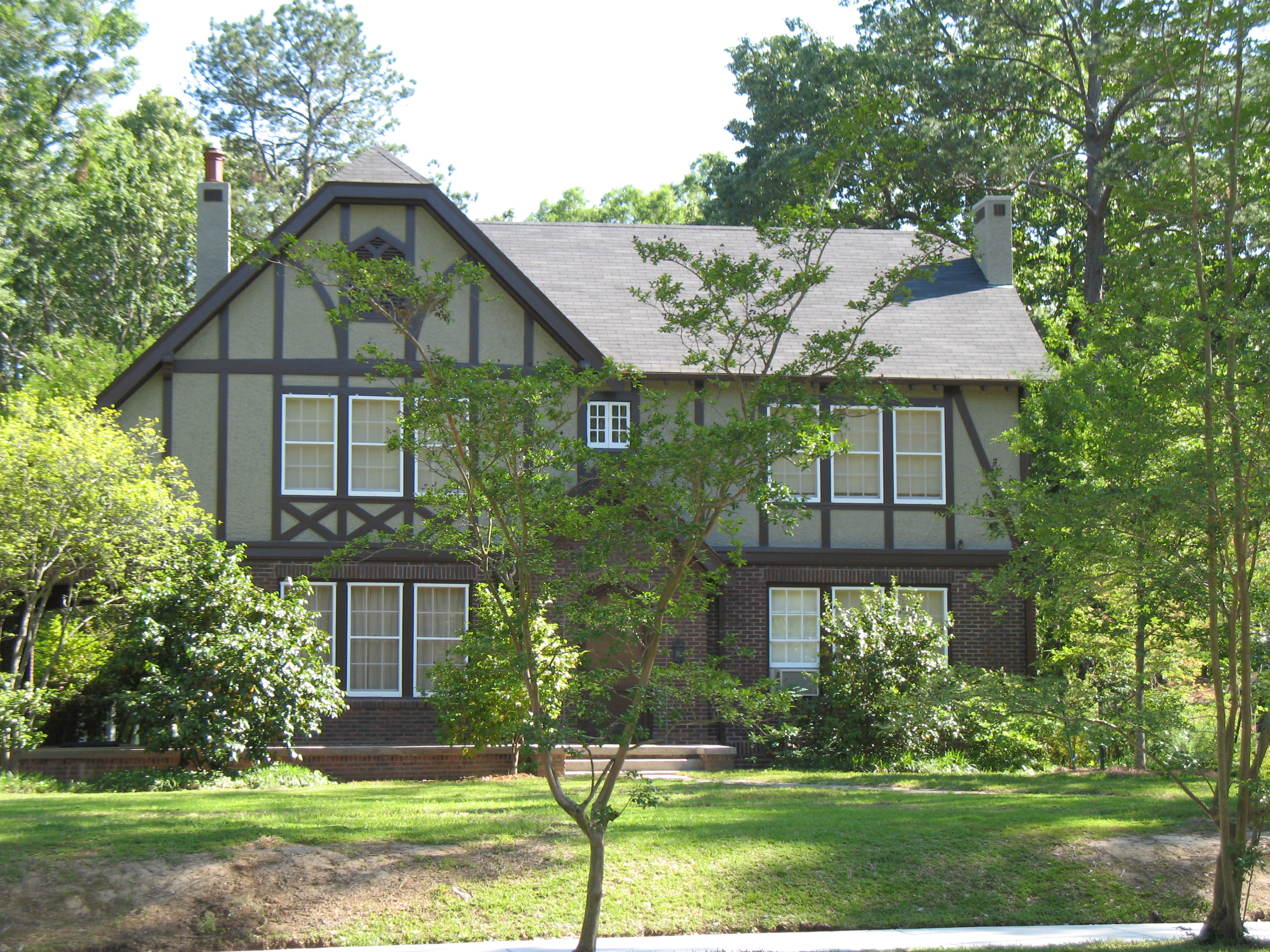
The Eudora Welty House

Welty studied at the Mississippi State College for Women from 1925 to 1927, then transferred to the University of Wisconsin to complete her studies in English literature. At the suggestion of her father, she studied advertising at Columbia University. Having graduated during the Great Depression, she struggled to find work in New York.

Soon after Welty returned to Jackson in 1931, her father died of leukemia. She took a job at a local radio station and wrote as a correspondent about Jackson society for the Memphis newspaper The Commercial Appeal. In 1933, she began work for the Works Progress Administration. As a publicity agent, she collected stories, conducted interviews, and took photographs of daily life in Mississippi. She gained a wider view of Southern life and relationships; she would later draw from these experiences for her short stories. During this time she also held meetings with fellow writers and friends in her house, forming a group she called the Night-blooming Cereus Club. Three years later, she left her job to become a full-time writer.

In 1936, she published "The Death of a Traveling Salesman" in the literary magazine Manuscript, and soon published stories in other notable publications including The Sewanee Review and The New Yorker. She strengthened her place as an influential Southern writer with the publication of her first book of short stories, A Curtain of Green. Her newfound success won her a seat on the staff of The New York Times Book Review as well as the Guggenheim Fellowship, which enabled her to travel to France, England, Ireland, and Germany. While abroad, she spent some time as a resident lecturer at the University of Oxford and the University of Cambridge; she was the first woman to be permitted into the hall of Peterhouse. In 1960, she returned to Jackson to care for her elderly mother and two brothers.

After the field secretary of the NAACP in Mississippi Medgar Evers was assassinated, she published a story in The New Yorker, "Where Is the Voice Coming From?", from the first-person perspective as the assassin.

In 1971, she published a collection of her photographs depicting the Great Depression, titled One Time, One Place. Two years later, she received the Pulitzer Prize for Fiction for her novel The Optimist's Daughter. She lectured at Harvard University and eventually adapted her talks as a three-part memoir titled One Writer's Beginnings. Throughout the 1970s, Welty carried on a lengthy correspondence with novelist Ross Macdonald, creator of the Lew Archer series of detective novels.

She continued to live in her family house in Jackson until her death from natural causes on July 23, 2001. She is buried in Greenwood Cemetery in Jackson. Her headstone has a quote from The Optimist's Daughter: "For her life, any life, she had to believe, was nothing but the continuity of its love."

== Photography ==
While Welty worked as a publicity agent for the Works Progress Administration, she took photographs of people from all economic and social classes in her spare time. Her photographs from the 1930s focused on Mississippi's rural poor and the effects of the Great Depression. Collections of her photographs were published as One Time, One Place (1971) and Photographs (1989). Her photographs inspired several of her short stories, including "Why I Live at the P.O.", which was centered on a woman she photographed ironing in the back of a small post office. Although focused on her writing, Welty continued to take photographs until the 1950s.

Welty's photographs were the subject of the National Museum of Women in the Arts exhibition Passionate Observer: Photographs by Eudora Welty which was on display October 27, 2003 to February 29, 2004.

== Writing career and major works ==
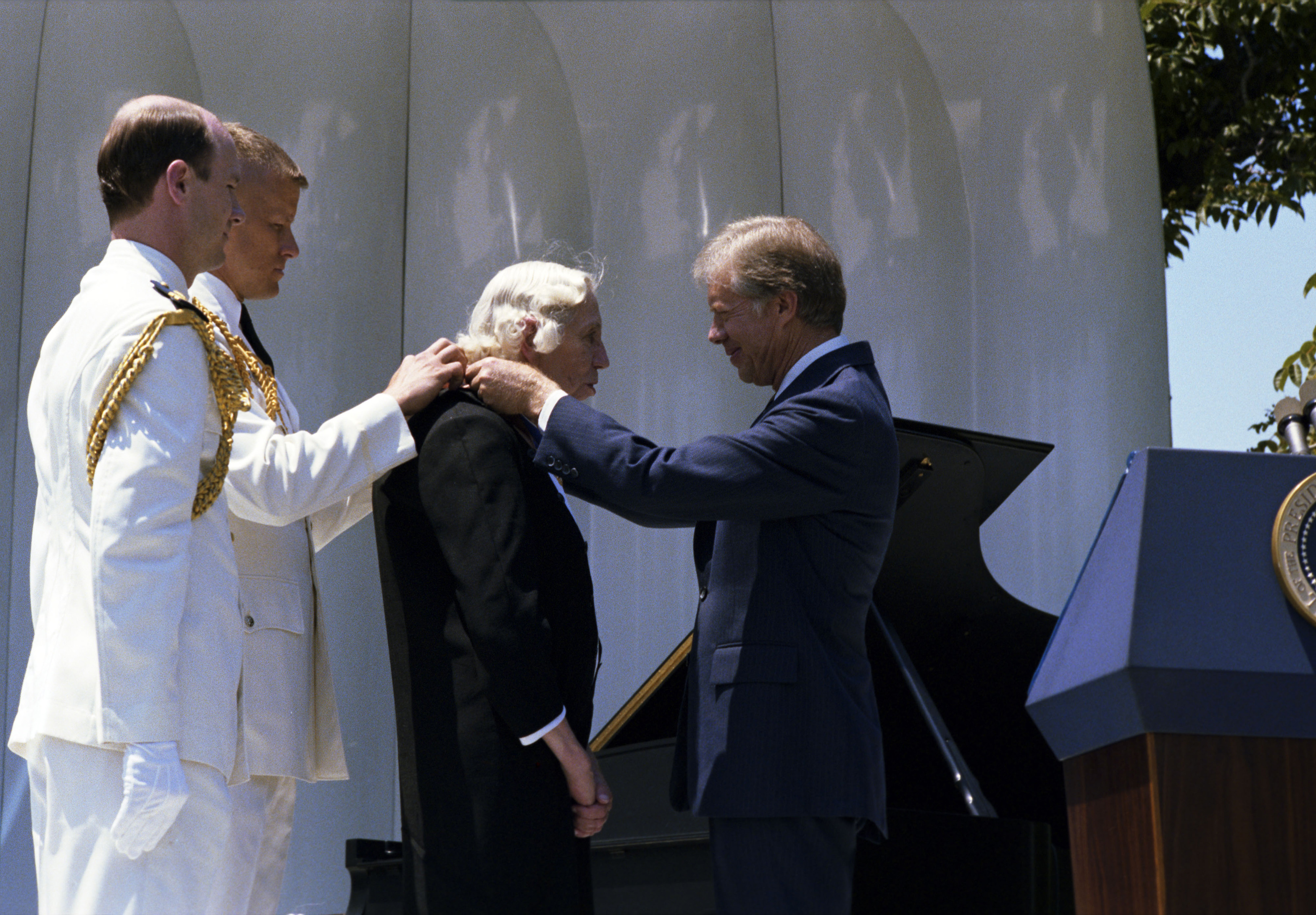
Welty is presented the Presidential Medal of Freedom by President Jimmy Carter in 1980

Welty's first short story, "Death of a Traveling Salesman", was published in 1936. In May 1940 the literary agent Diarmuid Russell wrote to her, "John Woodburn of Doubleday's has suggested that I write to you to see if you might need the service of an agent. I suppose you know the parasitic way an agent works taking 10% of the author's takings. He is rather a benevolent parasite because authors as a rule make more when they have an agent than they do without one." Welty accepted Russell's offer; he represented her and was her friend for many years.

Her work attracted the attention of author Katherine Anne Porter, who became a mentor to her and wrote the foreword to Welty's first collection of short stories, A Curtain of Green, in 1941. The book established Welty as one of American literature's leading lights and featured the stories "Why I Live at the P.O.", "Petrified Man", and the frequently anthologized "A Worn Path". Excited by the printing of Welty's works in publications such as The Atlantic Monthly, the Junior League of Jackson of which Welty was a member requested permission from the publishers to reprint some of her works. She eventually published over forty short stories, five novels, three works of non-fiction, and one children's book.

The short story "Why I Live at the P.O." was published in 1941 along with two others in The Atlantic Monthly. It was republished later that year in Welty's first collection of short stories, A Curtain of Green. "A Worn Path" was also published in The Atlantic Monthly and A Curtain of Green. It is seen as one of Welty's finest short stories, winning the second-place O. Henry Award in 1941.

Welty's debut novel, The Robber Bridegroom (1942), deviated from her previous psychologically inclined works, presenting static, fairy-tale characters. Some critics suggest that she worried about "encroaching on the turf of the male literary giant to the north of her in Oxford, Mississippi—William Faulkner", and therefore wrote in a fairy-tale style instead of a historical one. Most critics and readers saw it as a modern Southern fairy-tale and noted that it employs themes and characters reminiscent of the Grimm Brothers' works.

Immediately after the murder of Medgar Evers in 1963, Welty wrote "Where Is the Voice Coming From?". As she later said, she wondered: "Whoever the murderer is, I know him: not his identity, but his coming about, in this time and place. That is, I ought to have learned by now, from here, what such a man, intent on such a deed, had going on in his mind. I wrote his story—my fiction—in the first person: about that character's point of view". Welty's story was published in The New Yorker soon after Byron De La Beckwith's arrest.

Winner of the Pulitzer Prize for Fiction, The Optimist's Daughter (1972) is believed by some to be Welty's best novel. It was written at a much later date than the bulk of her work. As poet Howard Moss wrote in The New York Times, the book is "a miracle of compression, the kind of book, small in scope but profound in its implications, that rewards a lifetime of work". The plot focuses on family struggles when the daughter and the second wife of a judge confront each other in the limited confines of a hospital room while the judge undergoes eye surgery.

Welty gave a series of addresses at Harvard University, revised and published as One Writer's Beginnings (Harvard, 1983). It was the first book published by Harvard University Press to be a New York Times Best Seller (at least 32 weeks on the list), and runner-up for the 1984 National Book Award for Nonfiction.

In 1992, she was awarded the Rea Award for the Short Story for her lifetime contributions to the American short story. Welty was a charter member of the Fellowship of Southern Writers, founded in 1987. She also taught creative writing at colleges and in workshops. She lived near Jackson's Belhaven College and was a common sight among the people of her home town.

Welty personally influenced several young Mississippi writers in their careers including Richard Ford, Ellen Gilchrist, and Elizabeth Spencer.

== Literary criticism related to Welty's fiction ==
"There is no wonder that a passion for independence sprang up in me at the earliest age. It took me a long time to manage the independence, for I loved those who protected me—and I wanted inevitably to protect them back. I have never managed to handle the guilt. In the act and the course of writing stories, these are two of the springs, one bright, one dark, that feed the stream."—Eudora Welty, One Writer's Beginnings (1984).

Welty was a prolific writer who created stories in multiple genres. Throughout her writing are the recurring themes of the paradox of human relationships, the importance of place (a recurring theme in most Southern writing), and the importance of mythological influences that help shape the theme.

Welty said that her interest in the relationships between individuals and their communities stemmed from her natural abilities as an observer. Perhaps the best examples can be found within the short stories in A Curtain of Green. "Why I Live at the P.O." comically illustrates the conflict between Sister and her immediate community, her family. This particular story uses lack of proper communication to highlight the underlying theme of the paradox of human connection. Another example is Miss Eckhart of The Golden Apples, who is considered an outsider in her town. Welty shows that this piano teacher's independent lifestyle allows her to follow her passions, but also highlights Miss Eckhart's longing to start a family and to be seen by the community as someone who belongs in Morgana. Her stories are often characterized by the struggle to retain identity while keeping community relationships.

Place is vitally important to Welty. She believed that place is what makes fiction seem real, because with place come customs, feelings, and associations. Place answers the questions, "What happened? Who's here? Who's coming?" Place is a prompt to memory; thus the human mind is what makes place significant. This is the job of the storyteller. "A Worn Path" is one short story that proves how place shapes how a story is perceived. Within the tale, the main character, Phoenix, must fight to overcome the barriers within the vividly described Southern landscape as she makes her trek to the nearest town. "The Wide Net" is another of Welty's short stories that uses place to define mood and plot. The river in the story is viewed differently by each character. Some see it as a food source, others see it as deadly, and some see it as a sign that "the outside world is full of endurance".

Welty is noted for using mythology to connect her specific characters and locations to universal truths and themes. Examples can be found within the short story "A Worn Path", the novel Delta Wedding, and the collection of short stories The Golden Apples. In "A Worn Path", the character Phoenix has much in common with the mythical bird. Phoenixes are said to be red and gold and are known for their endurance and dignity. Phoenix, the old Black woman, is described as being clad in a red handkerchief with undertones of gold and is noble and enduring in her difficult quest for the medicine to save her grandson. In "Death of a Traveling Salesman", the husband is given characteristics common to Prometheus. He comes home after bringing fire to his boss and is full of male libido and physical strength. Welty also refers to the figure of Medusa, who in "Petrified Man" and other stories is used to represent powerful or vulgar women.

Locations can also allude to mythology, as Welty proves in her novel Delta Wedding. As Professor Veronica Makowsky from the University of Connecticut writes, the setting of the Mississippi Delta has "suggestions of the goddess of love, Aphrodite or Venus-shells like that upon which Venus rose from the sea and female genitalia, as in the mound of Venus and Delta of Venus". The title The Golden Apples refers to the difference between people who seek silver apples and those who seek golden apples. It is drawn from W. B. Yeats' poem "The Song of Wandering Aengus", which ends "The silver apples of the moon, The golden apples of the sun". It also refers to myths of a golden apple being awarded after a contest. Welty used the symbol to illuminate the two types of attitudes her characters could take about life.

== Honors ==
- 1941: O. Henry Award, second place, "A Worn Path"
- 1942: O. Henry Award, first place, "The Wide Net"
- 1943: O. Henry Award, first place, "Livvie is Back"
- 1954: William Dean Howells medal for fiction, The Ponder Heart
- 1968: O. Henry Award, first place, "The Demonstrators"
- 1969: Fellow of the American Academy of Arts and Sciences
- 1970: The Edward MacDowell Medal
- 1973: Pulitzer Prize for Fiction, The Optimist's Daughter
- 1979: Honorary Doctorate of Letters from University of Illinois at Urbana–Champaign in Urbana, Illinois
- 1980: Presidential Medal of Freedom
- 1981: Honorary Doctorate of Humane Letters from Randolph-Macon Woman's College in Lynchburg, Virginia
- 1983: National Book Award for the first paperback edition of The Collected Works of Eudora Welty (Note: Welty's Collected Works won the 1983 award for paperback Fiction. From 1980 to 1983 in National Book Awards history there were dual hardcover and paperback awards in most categories. Most of the paperback award-winners were reprints, including this one.)
- 1983: Invited by Harvard University to give the first annual Massey Lectures in the History of American Civilization, revised and published as One Writer's Beginnings
- 1983: St. Louis Literary Award from the Saint Louis University Library Associates
- 1985: Honorary Doctorate of Letters from The College of William and Mary in Virginia
- 1985: Achievement Award, American Association of University Women
- 1986: National Medal of Arts.
- 1990: A recipient of the Governor's Award for Excellence in the Arts, Lifetime Achievement, which was the state of Mississippi's recognition of her extraordinary contribution to American Letters.
- 1991: National Book Foundation Medal for Distinguished Contribution to American Letters
- 1991: Peggy V. Helmerich Distinguished Author Award. The Helmerich Award is presented annually by the Tulsa Library Trust.
- 1992: Rea Award for the Short Story
- 1992: PEN/Malamud Award for the Short Story
- 1992: National Humanities Medal
- 1993: Charles Frankel Prize, National Endowment for the Humanities
- 1993: Distinguished Alumni Award, American Association of State Colleges and Universities
- 1996: Made a Chevalier de la Légion d'honneur by the French government
- 1998: First living author to have her works published in the prestigious Library of America series
- 2000: America Award for a lifetime contribution to international writing
- 2000: Induction into the National Women's Hall of Fame

== Commemoration ==
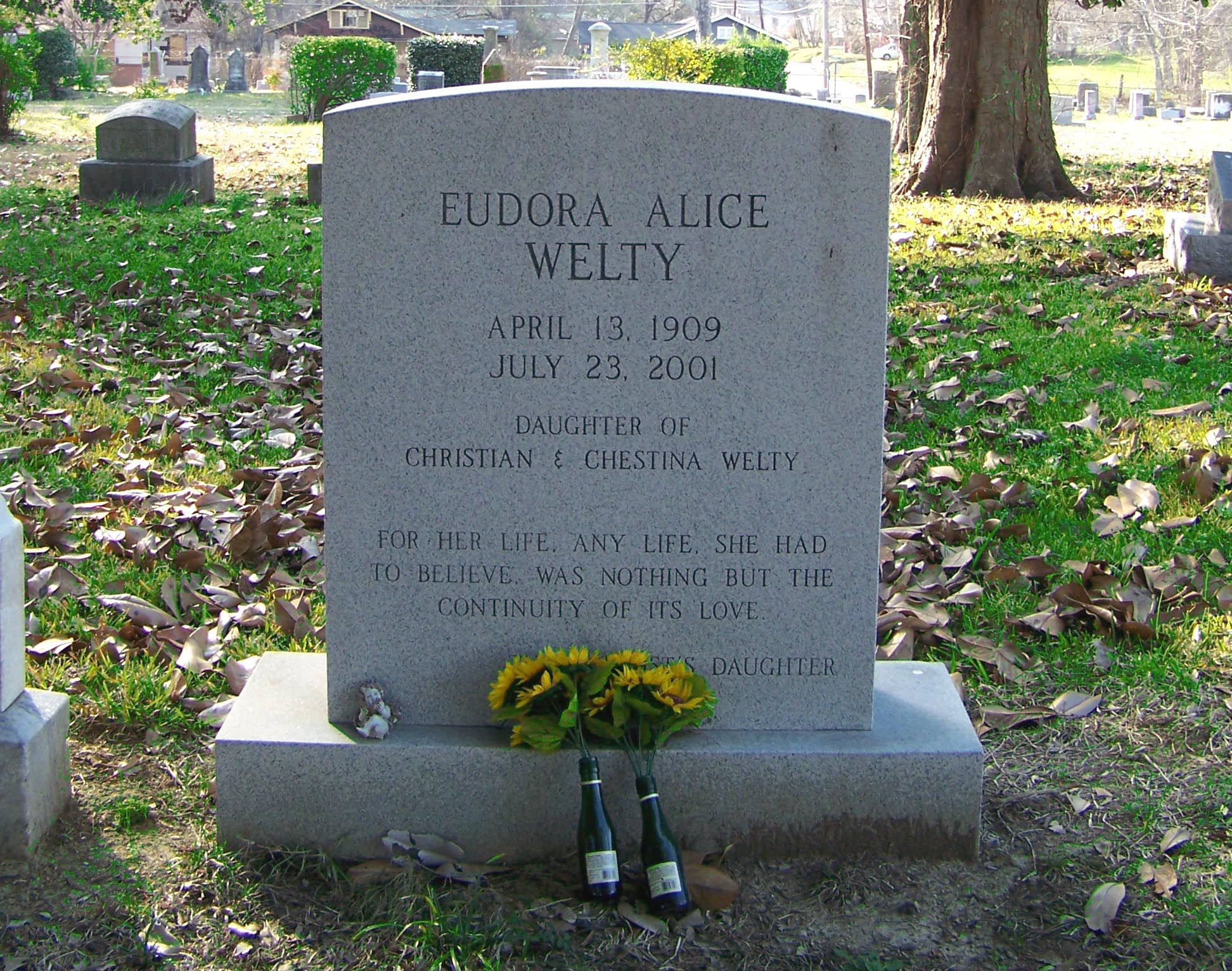
Welty's headstone at Greenwood Cemetery in Jackson, Mississippi

- In 1990, Steve Dorner named his e-mail program "Eudora", inspired by Welty's story "Why I Live at the P.O." Welty was reportedly "pleased and amused" by the tribute.
- In 1973, the state of Mississippi established May 2 as "Eudora Welty Day".
- Each October, Mississippi University for Women hosts the "Eudora Welty Writers' Symposium" to promote and celebrate the work of contemporary Southern writers.
- Mississippi State University sculpture professor Critz Campbell has designed furniture inspired by Welty, that has been featured in Smithsonian magazine, The New York Times, the Los Angeles Times, The Washington Post and Elle magazine, and on the Discovery Channel.
- A portrait of Eudora Welty hangs in the National Portrait Gallery of the Smithsonian; it was painted by her friend Mildred Nungester Wolfe.
- On September 10, 2018, Eudora Welty became the first author honored with a historical marker through the Mississippi Writers Trail. The historical marker was installed at the Eudora Welty House and Garden in Jackson, Mississippi.
- A tribute to Eudora Welty is included in Mississippi's float for the 137th Rose Parade.

== Works ==
=== Short-story collections ===
- A Curtain of Green, 1941
- The Wide Net and Other Stories, 1943
- The Golden Apples, 1949
- The Bride of the Innisfallen and Other Stories, 1955
- Thirteen Stories, 1965
- The Collected Stories of Eudora Welty, 1980
- Moon Lake and Other Stories, 1980
- Morgana: Two Stories from The Golden Apples, 1988

=== Novels ===
- The Robber Bridegroom (novella), 1942
  - Musical based on the novella
- Delta Wedding, 1946
- The Ponder Heart, 1954
- The Shoe Bird (juvenile), 1964
- Losing Battles, 1970
- The Optimist's Daughter, 1972 (revised version)

=== Essays ===
- The Eye of the Story, 1979
- One Writer's Beginnings, 1984
- On Writing, 2002

=== Short stories ===
Title	Publication	Collected in
"Death of a Traveling Salesman"	Manuscript (May 1936)	A Curtain of Green
"The Doll"	The Tanager (June 1936)	-
"Lily Daw and the Three Ladies"	Prairie Schooner (Winter 1937)	A Curtain of Green
"Retreat"	River (March 1937)	-
"A Piece of News"	The Southern Review (Summer 1937)	A Curtain of Green
"Flowers for Marjorie"	Prairie Schooner (Summer 1937)	A Curtain of Green
"A Memory"	The Southern Review (Fall 1937)	A Curtain of Green
"Old Mr. Marblehall" a.k.a. "Old Mr. Grenada"	The Southern Review (Spring 1938)	A Curtain of Green
"The Whistle"	Prairie Schooner (Fall 1938)	A Curtain of Green
"A Curtain of Green"	The Southern Review (Fall 1938)	A Curtain of Green
"Magic"	Manuscript (September 1938)	-
"Petrified Man"	The Southern Review (Spring 1939)	A Curtain of Green
"The Hitch-Hikers"	The Southern Review (Fall 1939)	A Curtain of Green
"Keela, the Outcast Indian Maiden"	New Directions in Prose & Poetry (1940)	A Curtain of Green
"A Worn Path"	The Atlantic (February 1941)	A Curtain of Green
"Why I Live at the P.O."	The Atlantic (April 1941)	A Curtain of Green
"A Visit of Charity"	Decision, A Review of Free Culture (June 1941)	A Curtain of Green
"Powerhouse"	The Atlantic (June 1941)	A Curtain of Green
"Clytie"	The Southern Review (Summer 1941)	A Curtain of Green
"The Key"	Harper's Bazaar (August 1941)	A Curtain of Green
"The Purple Hat"	Harper's Bazaar (November 1941)	The Wide Net and Other Stories
"First Love"	Harper's Bazaar (February 1942)	The Wide Net and Other Stories
"A Still Moment"	American Prefaces (Spring 1942)	The Wide Net and Other Stories
"The Wide Net"	Harper's Magazine (May 1942)	The Wide Net and Other Stories
"The Winds"	Harper's Bazaar (August 1942)	The Wide Net and Other Stories
"Asphodel"	The Yale Review (September 1942)	The Wide Net and Other Stories
"Livvie" a.k.a. "Livvie Is Back"	The Atlantic Monthly (November 1942)	The Wide Net and Other Stories
"At the Landing"	Tomorrow (April 1943)	The Wide Net and Other Stories
"A Sketching Trip"	The Atlantic (June 1945)	-
"The Whole World Knows"	Harper's Bazaar (March 1947)	The Golden Apples
"Hello and Good-Bye"	The Atlantic (July 1947)	-
"June Recital" a.k.a. "Golden Apples"	Harper's Bazaar (September 1947)	The Golden Apples
"Shower of Gold"	The Atlantic (May 1948)	The Golden Apples
"Music from Spain"	Music From Spain, pub. June 1948	The Golden Apples
"The Wanderers" a.k.a. "The Hummingbirds"	Harper's Bazaar (March 1949)	The Golden Apples
"Sir Rabbit"	The Hudson Review (Spring 1949)	The Golden Apples
"Moon Lake"	The Sewanee Review (Summer 1949)	The Golden Apples
"Circe" a.k.a. "Put Me in the Sky!"	Accent (Fall 1949)	The Bride of the Innisfallen and Other Stories
"The Burning "	Harper's Bazaar (March 1951)	The Bride of the Innisfallen and Other Stories
"The Bride of the Innisfallen"	The New Yorker (December 1, 1951)	The Bride of the Innisfallen and Other Stories
"No Place for You, My Love"	The New Yorker (September 20, 1952)	The Bride of the Innisfallen and Other Stories
"Kin"	The New Yorker (November 15, 1952)	The Bride of the Innisfallen and Other Stories
"Ladies in Spring" a.k.a. "Spring"	The Sewanee Review (Winter 1954)	The Bride of the Innisfallen and Other Stories
"Going to Naples"	Harper's Bazaar (July 1954)	The Bride of the Innisfallen and Other Stories
"Where Is the Voice Coming From?"	The New Yorker (July 6, 1963)	The Collected Stories of Eudora Welty
"The Demonstrators"	The New Yorker (November 26, 1966)	The Collected Stories of Eudora Welty
"Acrobats in a Park"	Delta (November 1977)	-

== See also ==
- Mississippi literature
