= Strange Fruit =

1939 song recorded by Billie Holiday

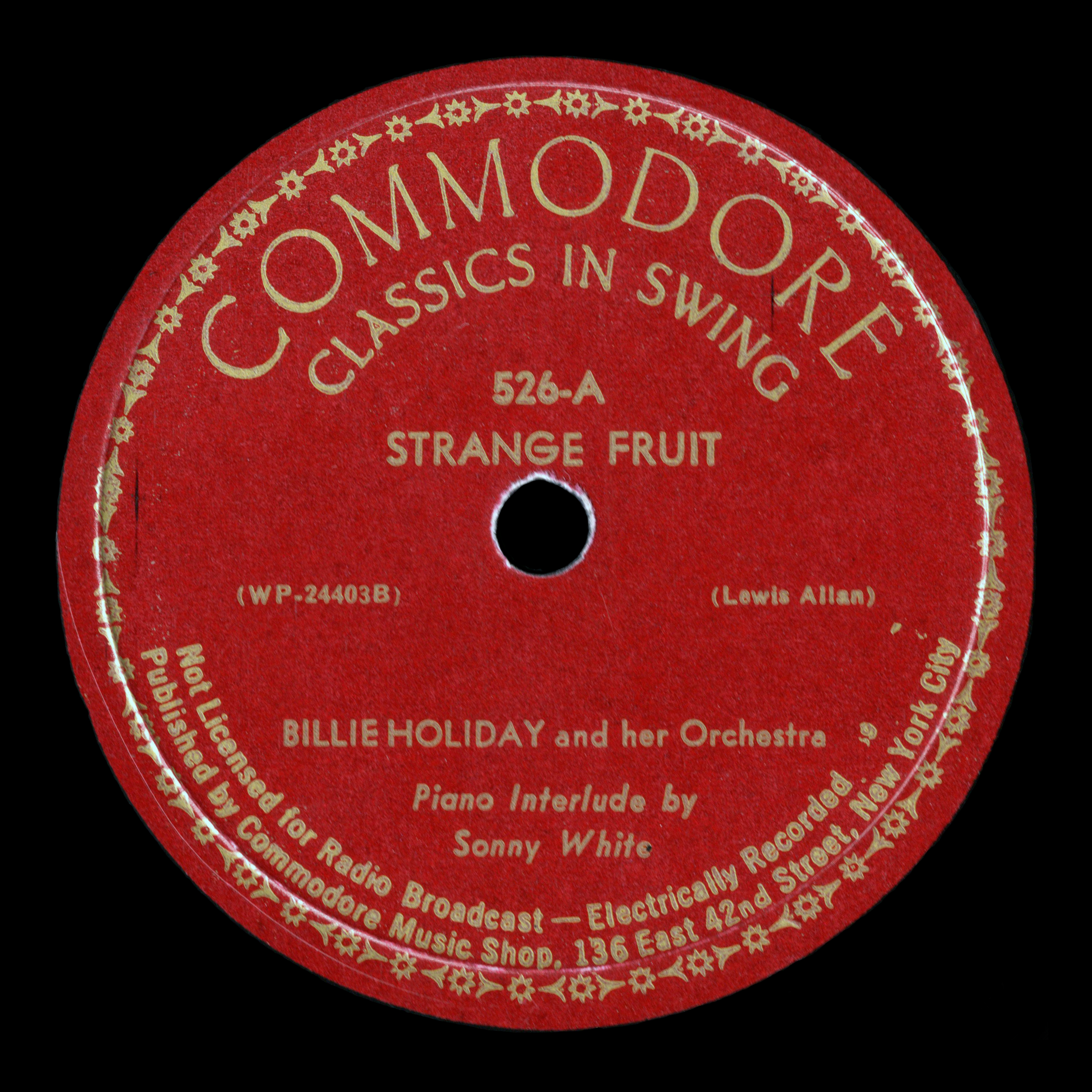

Single by Billie Holiday
- B-side: "Fine and Mellow"
- Released: 1939
- Recorded: April 20, 1939
- Genre: Blues; jazz
- Length: 3:02
- Label: Commodore
- Songwriter: Abel Meeropol
- Producer: Milt Gabler

Billie Holiday singles chronology
"I'm Gonna Lock My Heart" (1938)	"Strange Fruit" (1939)	"God Bless the Child" (1942)

Official audio
- "Strange Fruit" on YouTube

"Strange Fruit" is a song written and composed by Abel Meeropol (under his pseudonym Lewis Allan) and recorded by Billie Holiday in 1939. The lyrics were drawn from a poem by Meeropol, published in 1937. The song protests the lynching of African Americans with lyrics that compare the victims to the fruit of trees. Such lynchings had reached a peak in the Southern United States at the turn of the 20th century, and most victims were African American. The song was described as "a declaration of war" and "the beginning of the civil rights movement" by Atlantic Records co-founder Ahmet Ertegun.

Meeropol set his lyrics to music with his wife Anne Shaffer and the singer Laura Duncan and performed it as a protest song in New York City venues in the late 1930s, including Madison Square Garden. Holiday's version was inducted into the Grammy Hall of Fame in 1978. It was also included in the "Songs of the Century" list of the Recording Industry Association of America and the National Endowment for the Arts. In 2002, "Strange Fruit" was selected for preservation in the National Recording Registry by the Library of Congress as being "culturally, historically or aesthetically significant".

== Poem and song ==
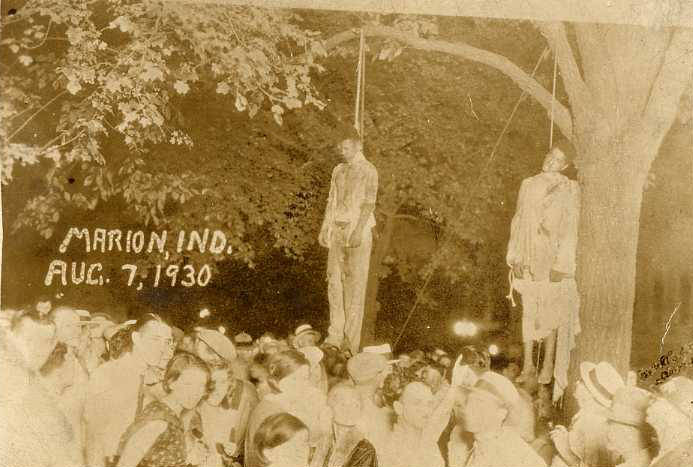
Meeropol cited this photograph of the lynching of Thomas Shipp and Abram Smith, August 7, 1930, as inspiring his poem.

"Strange Fruit" originated as a protest poem against lynchings. In the poem, Abel Meeropol expressed his horror at lynchings of African Americans, inspired by Lawrence Beitler's photograph of the 1930 lynching of Thomas Shipp and Abram Smith in Marion, Indiana.

Meeropol published the poem under the title "Bitter Fruit" in January 1937 in The New York Teacher, a union magazine of the New York teachers union. Though Meeropol had asked others (notably Earl Robinson) to set his poems to music, Meeropol set "Strange Fruit" to music himself. First performed by Meeropol's wife Anne Shaffer and their friends in social contexts, his protest song gained a certain success in and around New York. Meeropol, Shaffer, and the Black vocalist Laura Duncan performed it at Madison Square Garden.

== Billie Holiday's performances and recordings ==
One version of events claims that Barney Josephson, the founder of Café Society in Greenwich Village, New York's first integrated nightclub, heard the song and introduced it to Billie Holiday. Other reports say that Robert Gordon, who was directing Holiday's show at Café Society, heard the song at Madison Square Garden and introduced it to her. Holiday first performed the song at Café Society in 1939. She said that singing it made her fearful of retaliation but, because its imagery reminded her of her father Clarence Halliday, she continued to sing the piece, making it a regular part of her live performances. Because of the power of the song, Josephson drew up some rules: Holiday would close with it; the waiters would stop all service in advance; the room would be in darkness except for a spotlight on Holiday's face; and there would be no encore. During the musical introduction to the song, Holiday stood with her eyes closed, as if she were evoking a prayer.

"Strange Fruit" (1939) by Billie Holiday

Holiday approached her recording label, Columbia, about the song, but the company feared reaction by record retailers in the South, as well as negative reaction from affiliates of its co-owned radio network, CBS. When Holiday's producer John Hammond also refused to record it, she turned to her friend Milt Gabler, owner of the Commodore label. Holiday sang "Strange Fruit" for him a cappella, and moved him to tears. Columbia gave Holiday a one-session release from her contract so she could record it; Frankie Newton's eight-piece Café Society Band was used for the session in an arrangement by Newton. Because Gabler worried the song was too short, he asked pianist Sonny White to improvise an introduction. On the recording, Holiday starts singing after 70 seconds. It was recorded on April 20, 1939. Gabler worked out a special arrangement with Vocalion Records to record and distribute the song.

Holiday recorded two major sessions of the song at Commodore, one in 1939 and one in 1944. The song was highly regarded; the 1939 recording eventually sold a million copies, in time becoming the biggest-selling recording of Holiday's career. Holiday was so well known for her rendition of "Strange Fruit" that "she crafted a relationship to the song that would make them inseparable". Holiday's 1939 version of the song was included in the National Recording Registry on January 27, 2003. In her 1956 autobiography, Lady Sings the Blues, Holiday suggested that she, together with Meeropol, her accompanist Sonny White, and arranger Danny Mendelsohn, set the poem to music. The writers David Margolick and Hilton Als dismissed that claim in their work Strange Fruit: The Biography of a Song, writing that hers was "an account that may set a record for most misinformation per column inch". When challenged, Holiday—whose autobiography had been ghostwritten by William Dufty—claimed, "I ain't never read that book."

In October 1939, Samuel Grafton of the New York Post said of "Strange Fruit", "If the anger of the exploited ever mounts high enough in the South, it now has its Marseillaise." The anti-lynching movement adopted "Strange Fruit" as its anthem. Since the 1930s, several unsuccessful attempts were made in Congress to have lynching made a federal crime which were stymied by filibusters in the Senate by Southerners. In an attempt to achieve a two-thirds majority in the Senate that would break the filibusters by Southern senators, anti-racism activists were encouraged to mail copies of "Strange Fruit" to their senators.

== Cover versions ==
Other notable cover versions of the song include the renditions of Nina Simone, Georgia Lee, Jill Scott, UB 40, Siouxsie and the Banshees, and Jeff Buckley. The Financial Times considered that Nina Simone "came close" to the original song "with her similarly bleak 1965 version". The Australian Jazz Museum explains how Georgia Lee's rendition is possibly the first Australian performance of the song, and ultimately proved so controversial it was banned from radio.

Journalist Fiona Sturges noted that "other interpreters have included Diana Ross, Jeff Buckley, Siouxsie and the Banshees, Cocteau Twins and Robert Wyatt", adding that "Ye revived interest in the song when he sampled Simone's recording for his 2013 track 'Blood on the Leaves'." The Times remarked that when West sampled it for a song, "about an ex-girlfriend, there was uproar". In contrast, journalist Robert Dean noted that other covers "from acts as varied as UB40 and Siouxsie and the Banshees, have been highly respectful."

The New York Times wrote that "Josh White and Nina Simone were among the few artists to attempt it in the 1950s and 1960s. But ... many other musicians—from Sting to Dee Dee Bridgewater to Tori Amos to Cassandra Wilson to UB40 to Siouxsie and the Banshees—have recorded "Strange Fruit", each cut an act of courage given Holiday's continuing hold over the song". Simone initially recorded the song for her album Pastel Blues, a recording described by journalist David Margolick in The New York Times as featuring a "plain and unsentimental voice".

The Los Angeles Times praised Siouxsie and the Banshees' version from the 1987 album Through the Looking Glass for "a solemn string section behind the vocals" and "a bridge of New Orleans funeral-march jazz" which highlighted the singer's "evocative interpretation". Buckley covered "Strange Fruit" after discovering it through Siouxsie and the Banshees' rendition. Journalist Lara Pellegrinelli wrote that Buckley seemed to "meditate on the meaning of humanity the way Walt Whitman did, considering all of its glorious and horrifying possibilities".

== Awards and honors ==
In 1999, Time magazine named "Strange Fruit" as "Best Song of the Century" in its December 31, 1999, issue. In 2002 the Library of Congress honored the song as one of 50 recordings chosen that year to add to the National Recording Registry. In 2005 The Atlanta Journal-Constitution listed the song as Number One on "100 Songs of the South". in 2010 the New Statesman listed it as one of the "Top 20 Political Songs". In 2021: Rolling Stone listed it as the 21st best song on their "Top 500 Best Songs of All Time". In 2025 Rolling Stone placed it at number 3 on its list of "The 100 Best Protest Songs of All Time". In 2026 Esquire included it on its list of "The 25 Most American Songs of All Time". In June 2026, CBS News included the song in its list of the 250 essential American songs of the past 250 years.

== Bibliography ==
- Clarke, Donald (1995). Billie Holiday: Wishing on the Moon. München: Piper. ISBN 978-3-492-03756-3.
- Davis, Angela (1999) [1998]. ""Strange Fruit": Musical and Social Consciousness" (PDF). Blues Legacies and Black Feminism. Vintage Books. ISBN 0-679-77126-3 – via Amherst.edu.
- Holiday, Billie; Dufty, William (1992). Lady Sings the Blues. Edition Nautilus. ISBN 978-3-89401-110-9.
- Margolick, David (2001). Strange Fruit: The Biography of a Song. Harper Collins. ISBN 978-0-060-95956-2.
