= Clytie (Welty story) =

- Short story by Eudora Welty
- Country: United States
- Language: English

Publication
- Publisher: The Southern Review
- Publication date: Summer 1941

"Clytie" is a short story by Eudora Welty first appearing in The Southern Review (Summer 1941) and first collected in A Curtain of Green (1941) by Doubleday.

== Plot ==
"Clytie" is presented from a third-person omniscient point-of-view, with Clytie Farr as the focal character. The story is set in the fictional village of Farr's Gin in the Deep South during the 1930s.

The Farr family, formerly well-to-do local elites, are now impoverished. The bed-ridden patriarch, "Papa" Farr, suffers from advanced dementia. The mother is deceased. The three surviving children are Octavia, Gerald and Clytie, none of whom have married. The eldest son, Henry Farr, committed suicide with a pistol years before.

Octavia is the matriarch of the household. Gerald is an invalid who rarely emerges from his bedroom. Miss Clytie performs the duties of a domestic servant for the entire family. Octavia is her disciplinarian older sister, subjecting Clytie to petty cruelties. The family is largely isolated from the community. Only one resident of Farr's Gin, the reluctant barber Mr. Bobo, has access to the household: he is admitted once a week to shave the elder Farr. A former black servant for the Farr patriarch, Old Lethy, is barred from the premises, but lurks near the property. Clytie is often observed wandering aimlessly on main street in rainstorms. Regarded as the village idiot, she is both ridiculed and pitied.

When Clytie is commanded by Octavia to collect rainwater from the cistern barrel, she confronts her aging face in the water's surface. In that moment she becomes aware of the depth of her suffering, and casts herself headfirst into the barrel: "When Old Lethy found her, she had fallen forward into the barrel, with her poor ladylike black-stockinged legs up-ended and hung apart like a pair of tongs."

== Narrative style: point-of-view ==
Interviewer Linda Lipnack Kuehl : "You wrote somewhere that we should still tolerate Jane Austen's kind of family novel. Is Austen a kindred spirit?"

Eudora Welty: Tolerate? "I should just think so! I love and admire all she does, and profoundly, but I don't read her or anyone else for kindredness"—Interview in The Paris Review, The Art of Fiction. Fall 1972

Literary critic and poet Carol Ann Johnston reports that Welty emulates British author Jane Austen's fiction with respect to her "narrative position" so as to "shape the reader's view of community."

Welty is carefully conscious of where the narrator in her stories stand in relation to the story she tells. Like Austen, Welty has the gift of keeping her narrators at just the right distance from the story...

Johnston cites "Clytie" as a superb application of Austen's narrative method to its focal character, Clytie, whose tragic life and death exposes the suffering inflicted by her family: "We could not begin to understand the complexity of tone in the story had it been placed in the wrong frame."

Author and critic Katherine Anne Porter in her Introduction to A Curtain of Green (1941) comments on "Clytie": "[T]he very shape of madness takes place before your eyes in a straight account of actions and speech, the personal appearance and habits of dress of the main character and her family."

== Theme: Clytie and Narcissus mythology ==
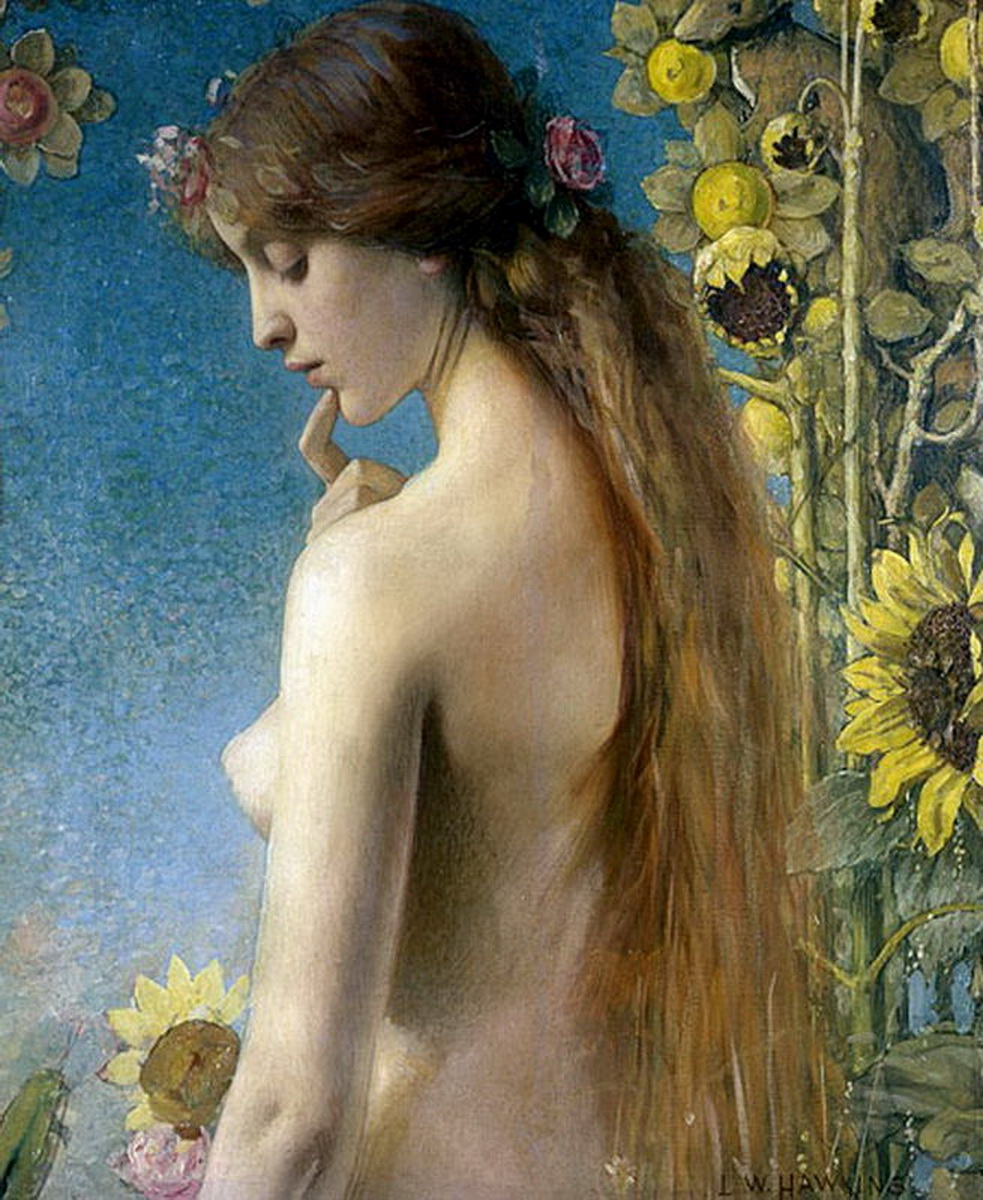
Clytie, by Louis Welden Hawkins

.Johnston reminds readers that Clytie is the Greek mythic name of a sea nymph and daughter to Oceanus, the god of water. She fell in love with the sun god, Apollo. Welty employs metaphor linking this goddess to Narcissus, in that Clytie's final act is to glimpse her face in a barrel of water, into which she plunges and drowns.

Most readers connect Clytie's experience with the mythic story of Narcissus...Clytie's story is Welty's version of the results of women's lack of self-knowledge..."

== Sources ==
- Johnston, Carol Ann. 1997. Eudora Welty: A Study of the Short Fiction. Twayne Publishers, New York. Gordon Weaver, general editor. ISBN 0-8057-7936-1
- Kuehl, Linda. 1972. Eudora Welty, The Art of Fiction No. 47. The Paris Review, Issue 55, Fall 1972. https://www.theparisreview.org/interviews/4013/the-art-of-fiction-no-47-eudora-welty Accessed 28 September, 2025.
- Marrs, Suzanne. 2005. Eudora Welty: A Biography. Harvest Books, Orlando, Florida. ISBN 978-0-15-603063-2 (paperback)
- Porter, Katherine Anne. 1941. "Introduction" to A Curtain of Green (1941). pp. ix-xix. Doubleday, New York. OCLC 794401
- Welty, Eudora. 1978. "The Radiance of Jane Austen" in Eye of the Story. pp. 3-13. Random House, New York. ISBN 978-0394727325
- Welty, Eudora. 2001. The Collected Stories of Eudora Welty. Barnes & Noble Modern Classics edition. pp. 83-92. ISBN 0-7607-2409-1
