= Keela, the Outcast Indian Maiden =

- Short story by Eudora Welty
- Country: United States
- Language: English

Publication
- Publisher: New Directions in Prose & Poetry
- Publication date: 1940

"Keela, the Outcast Indian Maiden" is a short story by Eudora Welty originally appearing in New Directions in Prose & Poetry in 1940, and first collected in A Curtain of Green (1941) by Harcourt Brace Jovanovich.

== Plot ==
A tiny, club-footed black man, Little Lee Roy, lives with his young children in the countryside. A convoy of trucks carrying the gear for a traveling circus passes by and an employee impulsively kidnaps the crippled man: "[J]ust seen this little deformed nigger man, sittin' on a fence, and just took it. It couldn't help it."

Circus personnel dress Lee Roy in a grotesque costume and makeup and place him in a freak show exhibit promoted as "Keela, the Outcast Indian Maiden." His performance includes killing chickens by biting their heads off and consuming them raw. Steve, a naive 20-year-old white man, is enlisted to act as barker. Lee Roy is instructed to behave as if he were vicious and violent.

In time, a good Samaritan discerns that the show is a fraud; he notifies the authorities and the circus owners are charged. Lee Roy is freed and returns to his children.

Steve visits Lee Roy's home with the circus owner, the latter who faces legal problems for the kidnapping. Lee Roy sits on the porch, but neither white man addresses him, each offering one another self-justifications for their criminality. They hand the Negro some pocket change and depart. That evening, Lee Roy begins to recount "de ole times when I used to be wid de circus" to which his children reply "Hush up, Pappy."

== Background ==
Biographer Suzanne Marrs reports that Welty was hired in the summer of 1936 to serve in the New Deal's Works Progress Administration (WPA) as an assistant publicity agent. The 27-year-old Welty, in the course of her often mundane duties around the state of Mississippi, was exposed to the struggles of working people during The Great Depression. Marrs writes:

Whatever the job's frustrations, the WPA sparked at least one piece of fiction. During her travels for the agency she heard "about a little Negro man who was made to eat live chickens" and she came to understand more deeply the grotesque nature of racism.

This degraded freak show performer was the basis for Welty's character Little Lee Roy in "Keela, the Outcast Indian Maiden."

Rejected by Story magazine, the piece was ultimately accepted by New Directions in Prose & Poetry in 1940, becoming "a classic of the short-story genre."

== Theme ==
"Complex though it is, "Keela" makes an inescapable political and moral statement—the dehumanizing nature of racism is infinitely more grotesque than a carnival sideshow."—Biographer Suzanne Marrs in Eudora Welty: A Biography (2005).

Whereas the diminutive Lee Roy—"a crippled little Negro"—appears to be inurred to his degradation, his position is superior to that of the white 20-year-old Steve, who served as the freak show barker. Guilt-ridden and shamed at his role as an active agent in Lee Roy's abuse as "Keela, the Outcast Indian Maiden, his crime inflicting the abuse is unredeemable. Author and critic Katherine Anne Porter writes:

[T]he really unfortunate man is this story is the ignorant young white boy, who had innocently assisted at a wrong done the little Negro, and for a most complex reason, finds that no reparation is possible, or even disirable to the victim...

== Sources ==
- Johnston, Carol Ann. 1997. Eudora Welty: A Study of the Short Fiction. Twayne Publishers, New York. Gordon Weaver, general editor. ISBN 0-8057-7936-1
- Marrs, Suzanne. 2005. Eudora Welty: A Biography. Harvest Books, Orlando, Florida. ISBN 978-0-15-603063-2 (paperback)
- Porter, Katherine Anne. 1941. "Introduction" to A Curtain of Green (1941). pp. ix-xix. Doubleday, New York. OCLC 794401
- Welty, Eudora. 1955. A Curtain of Green. Doubleday, New York. OCLC 794401
- Welty, Eudora. 2001. The Collected Stories of Eudora Welta. Barnes & Noble Modern Classics edition. pp. 39-46. ISBN 0-7607-2409-1
