= Billie (2019 film) =

Documentary film about Billie Holiday

- Film poster
- Directed by: James Erskine
- Screenplay by: James Erskine
- Produced by: Barry Clark-Ewers
- Starring: Billie Holiday
- Music by: Hans Mullens
- Distributed by: Altitude Film Distribution
- Release date: September 5, 2019 (Telluride Film Festival)
- Running time: 98 minutes
- Country: United Kingdom
- Language: English

Billie is a 2019 documentary film about Billie Holiday, written and directed by British filmmaker James Erskine. The film is based around interviews recorded on audio cassettes through the 1970s by Linda Lipnack Kuehl, researching a book on Holiday that was never completed because of Kuehl's death in 1978: her body was found on a Washington D.C. street, and she was deemed to have died by suicide, although that supposition is disputed by her family. Erskine's documentary "is about both Holiday — as told through the voices of people who knew her — and Kuehl's obsession with crafting her biography."

Kuehl's interviews were with friends, family members, band members, peers from 1930s Harlem, piano players, psychiatrists and a pimp. Prominent figures from the jazz world who contributed recollections include Count Basie, Charles Mingus, Jo Jones and Sylvia Syms.

The film premiered at the Telluride Film Festival in September 2019.

== Reception ==
In The Guardian, the film was characterised as "a raw, unsanitised character study, in which Holiday is both combative and vulnerable, coy and revolutionary: a fiery, foul-mouthed thrill-seeker who never sacrificed her integrity. This is all the more refreshing considering that Holiday’s estate ... came on board as producers." The NME review concluded: "Billie never truly gets under its subject’s skin, leaving her motivation largely unexplored. The nearest we get is when the musician herself, asked why so many jazz greats die young, replies: 'We try to live 100 days in one day.' Billie Holiday lived so fast that few biographers appear able to keep with up her, but Erskine and Kuehl’s combined effort amounts to a long, loving look from a distance. And when your subject is as magnificent as Billie Holiday, that's enough."

The film was longlisted for a BAFTA in the feature documentary category.

In 2021, Billie won Documentary of the Year at the JJA Jazz Awards.
