= A Curtain of Green =

1941 book by Eudora Welty

A Curtain of Green: And Other Stories
- First edition cover
- Author: Eudora Welty
- Language: English
- Genre: Short story collection
- Published: Doubleday
- Publication date: 1941
- Publication place: United States
- Media type: Print (hardback)
- Pages: 289
- OCLC: 794401

A Curtain of Green was the first collection of short stories written by Eudora Welty. Published by Doubleday in 1941, the volume includes an introduction by Katherine Anne Porter.

In these stories, Welty looks at the state of Mississippi through the eyes of its inhabitants, the common people, both black and white, and presents a realistic view of the racial relations that existed at the time. Welty, though, looks past race, not overtly focusing on the subject, and sees Mississippi as what it is. The stories subtly combine myth and reality to create portraits of odd, but undeniable, beauty.

One of the most anthologized pieces in the collection is titled "A Worn Path." Welty's skill as a writer perhaps reaches its finest point with this story of an aging woman who faces her greatest obstacle, the journey of life as she tries to cope with the grief from the death of her grandson she goes through a journey comparable to a Greek epic.

== Stories in the collection ==
- "Lily Daw and the Three Ladies" (Prairie Schooner, Winter 1937)
- "A Piece of News" (The Southern Review, Summer 1937)
- "Petrified Man" (The Southern Review, Summer 1937)
- "The Key" (Harper's Bazaar, August 1941)
- "Keela, the Outcast Indian Maiden" (New Directions in Prose & Poetry, 1940)
- "Why I Live at the P.O." (The Atlantic, April 1941)
- "The Whistle" (Prairie Schooner, Fall 1938)
- "The Hitch-Hikers" (The Southern Review, Fall 1939)
- "A Memory" (The Southern Review, Fall 1937)
- "Clytie" (The Southern Review, Summer 1941)
- "Old Mr. Marblehall" (The Southern Review, Spring 1938; a.k.a "Old Mr. Grenada")
- "Flowers for Marjorie" (Prairie Schooner, Summer 1937)
- "A Curtain of Green" (The Southern Review, Fall 1938)
- "A Visit of Charity" (Decision, A Review of Free Culture, June 1941)
- "Death of a Traveling Salesman" (Manuscript magazine, May 1936)
- "Powerhouse" (The Atlantic, June 1941)
- "A Worn Path" (The Atlantic, February 1941)

== Background ==
"Given Welty’s visual mind, we should not be surprised to find that she uses a visual technique as the fundamental organizing principle in her stories."—Literary critic and poet Carol Ann Johnston in Eudora Welty: A Study of the Short Fiction.

During her highly production years 1937 and 1938, Welty was writing fiction as yet “destined to be classics of the short-story genre.” Encouraged by Ford Madox Ford and Katherine Anne Porter, among others, Welty felt assured that she could successfully pursue a literary career. John Woodburn, seeking talent for Doubleday, visited Welty at her Mississippi home during a tour of the South. In May 1940, Doubleday requested Diarmuid Russell, a literary agent, to offer his services to Welty; she accepted. Rather than insist she produce a novel, as G. P. Putnam's Sons and Harcourt Brace had indicated, Russell invited her to New York to write material for a short story collection. Welty continued to produce stories during that year—among these” A Worn Path” and “Why I Live at the P.O.—but Russell found it difficult to place much of her material in major periodicals, a crucial precursor to book publication. By early 1941, Russell had commitments for journal publication of all works that would appear in A Curtain of Green.

John Woodburn at Doubleday accepted terms for publication on January 21, 1941, after which Welty “fine-tuned” the fiction for upcoming publication in a number of periodicals (See Stories section below for periodicals). A Curtain of Green appeared later in 1941 with an Introduction by Katherine Anne Porter.

== Reception ==
A reviewer for Time magazine, November 24, 1941, declared that Welty “[h]as a strong taste for melodrama, and is preoccupied with the demented, the deformed, the queer, the highly spiced. Of the 17 pieces, only two report states of experience which could be called normal.”

Marianne Hauser, reviewing the book for The New York Times on November 18, 1941, praises "the author's fanatic love of people. With a few lines she draws the gesture of a deaf-mute, the windblown skirts of a Negro woman in the fields, the bewilderment of a child in the sickroom of an old people's asylum--and she has told more than many an author might tell in a novel of six hundred pages".

Katherine Anne Porter, who wrote the book's Introduction, observed:

These stories offer an extraordinary range of mood, pace, tone, and variety of material. The scene is limited to a town the author knows well; the farthest reaches of that scene never go beyond the boundaries of her own state....Dullness, bitterness, self-pity, baseness of all kinds can be most interesting material for a story provided these are not also the main elements in the mind of the author. There is nothing in the least vulgar or frustrated in Miss Welty's mind. She has simply an eye and an ear sharp, shrewd, and true as a tuning fork.

Literary critic and poet Carol Ann Johnston, writing in 1997, reminds readers that “stereotyping” among Welty’s contemporary critics was widespread: “All in all, these critics viewed Welty’s work as symptomatic of southern provinciality and a terminal attachment ot the gothic.

== Sources ==
- Johnston, Carol Ann. 1997. Eudora Welty: A Study of the Short Fiction. Twayne Publishers, New York. Gordon Weaver, general editor. ISBN 0-8057-7936-1
- Marrs, Suzanne. 2005. Eudora Welty: A Biography. Harvest Books, Orlando, Florida. ISBN 978-0-15-603063-2 (paperback)
- Olney, James. 1998. Where the Voice Came From. New York Times. November 22, 1998. https://archive.nytimes.com/www.nytimes.com/books/98/11/22/reviews/981122.22olneyt.html Accessed 22 September 2025.
- Pierpont, Claudia Roth. 1998. A Perfect Lady. The New Yorker, October 5, 1998.https://www.newyorker.com/magazine/1998/10/05/a-perfect-lady Accessed 22 September 2025.
- Welty, Eudora. 1955. A Curtain of Green. Doubleday, New York. OCLC 794401
- Welty, Eudora. 2001. The Collected Stories of Eudora Welty. Barnes & Noble Modern Classics. ISBN 0-7607-2409-1
