= Laura Duncan (singer) =

American singer

Laura Duncan was an American singer who appeared on stage in the 1930s and 1940s.

== Career ==
Duncan performed the song "Strange Fruit" (music and lyrics by Abe Meeropol) at Madison Square Garden in New York City in 1938. Duncan later performed it in Paul Robeson's show The Negro in American Life at the Golden Gate Ballroom in 1941.

She received positive reviews for her singing. She appeared in Noël Coward's Set to Music in 1939. In that revue, she sang "Mad About the Boy", which Billboard predicted would "undoubtedly be the hit of the revue".

In 1940, she appeared in the musical revue 'Tis of Thee at Maxine Elliott in New York, in which she sang "After Tonight".

Duncan appeared in the 1941 revue Talk out Loud at Unity House in Forest Park, Pennsylvania. Variety wrote, "Laura Duncan's masterly presentation of her vocal assignments should cause no doubt in any auditor's mind that here is another click". The show was reviewed more negatively by the New York Daily News when it reached Broadway.

A 1942 performance in a nightclub, Village Vanguard, earned her a mixed reception from Variety: "Laura Duncan, colored chanteuse, shows the greatest evidence of inexperience. She has a fine, sweet set of pipes, but must be careful in choice of numbers. She's strong on the blues stuff, but weak on a comedy novelty she tries to sell. One of the 'Adam and Eve' Biblical things, it's strictly the cob, particularly as she does it. Gal also should take greater care in obtaining an attractive hair-do and dress. She looks well-groomed, but too sedate, requiring something more striking. She's a strong possibility, though, with a proper break-in."

Duncan appeared in the 1942 revue It's About Time at the Barbizon-Plaza. "Laura Duncan, a very pretty but inhibited Negro girl, sings and she [and] Al Moss do nicely in his song, 'Haunted Heart.'"

Duncan performed at nineteenth annual Lenin Memorial Rally at Madison Square Garden again. She sang the song "Dive Bomber, Dive Low".

She appeared on two 1944 episodes of the radio program Columbia Presents Corwin: "The Lonesome Train" and "Dorie Got a Medal".

Duncan was politically active. She appeared in the revue FDR's Bandwagon in 1944. She participated with Pete Seeger and others in events associated with the Progressive Party campaign in the 1948 United States presidential election and in the People's Artists movement.
