= David Margolick =

American journalist (born 1952)

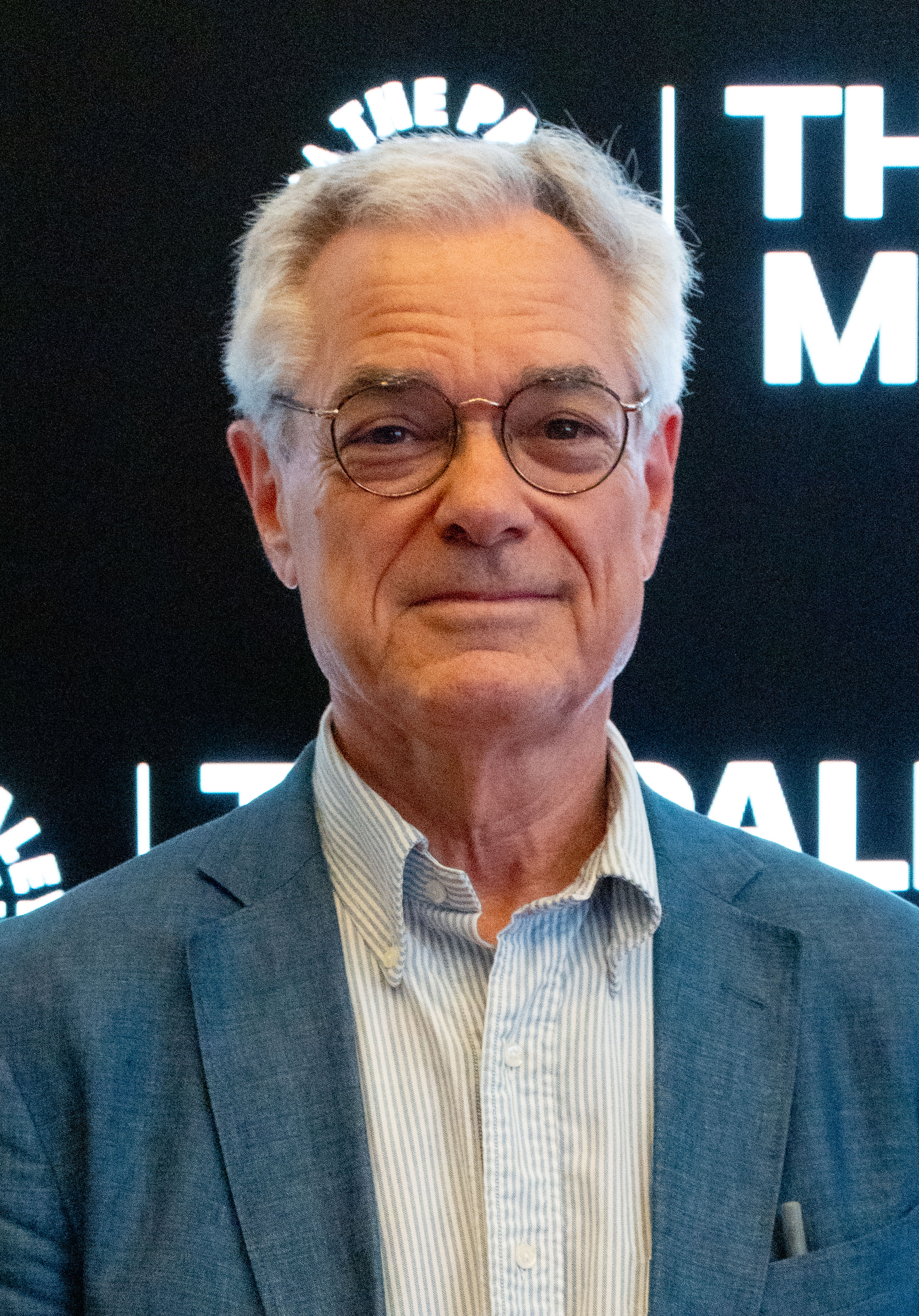
Margolick in 2026

David Margolick (born January 3, 1952) is an American journalist. He is long-time contributing editor at Vanity Fair. Margolick has held similar positions at Newsweek and Portfolio.com. Prior to joining Vanity Fair he was a legal affairs reporter at The New York Times, where he wrote the weekly “At the Bar" column and covered the trials of O.J. Simpson, Lorena Bobbitt, and William Kennedy Smith. In his fifteen years at the Times, the paper entered his work four times for the Pulitzer Prize. He remains a frequent contributor to The New York Times Book Review. His work has also appeared in The New York Review of Books, Tablet, and The Forward.

== Career ==
Margolick graduated from the Loomis Chaffee School in 1970 and graduated from the University of Michigan with a B.A. and Stanford Law School with a J.D. degree. He is the author of Dreadful: The Short Life and Gay Times of John Horne Burns, a biography of the controversial American author John Horne Burns. Margolick is also the author of Elizabeth and Hazel: Two Women of Little Rock, a study of the principal figures in the iconic photograph from the 1957 school desegregation crisis and published in October 2011 by Yale University Press. In July 2011 his long-form article A Predator Priest, about a family's long quest to bring a pedophile priest from Margolick's hometown of Putnam, Connecticut, to justice was posted on Kindle Singles. An article he authored for The New York Times on the Community Concert series includes significant discussion of his mother's work for the program and photos he took of classical music performers who came to Putnam, Connecticut, as a child.

His prior books include Beyond Glory: Joe Louis vs. Max Schmeling, and a World on the Brink, published by Knopf in 2005; Strange Fruit: The Biography of a Song (2001); At the Bar: The Passions and Peccadillos of American Lawyers (1995); and Undue Influence: The Epic Battle for the Johnson & Johnson Fortune (1994). Strange Fruit won a 2001 Firecracker Alternative Book Award.

In 2025 Margolick published When Caesar Was King, subtitled How Sid Caesar Reinvented American Comedy, a book on Sid Caesar’s Your Show of Shows for Nextbook’s Jewish Encounters Series (Schocken/Random House). He has been an adjunct professor in New York University’s Department of Journalism and lives in New York City and Sag Harbor.

== Bibliography ==
- The Promise and the Dream: The Untold Story of Martin Luther King Jr. and Robert F. Kennedy (RosettaBooks, April 2018)
- Dreadful: The Short Life and Gay Times of John Horne Burns (Other Press, June 2013)
- A Elizabeth and Hazel: Two Women of Little Rock (Yale University Press, October 2011)
- A Predator Priest (Kindle Singles, July 2011)
- Beyond Glory: Joe Louis vs. Max Schmeling, and a World on the Brink
- Strange Fruit: The Biography of a Song (with Hilton Als) (2000) ISBN 0060959568
- At the Bar (1995)
- Undue Influence: The Epic Battle for the Johnson & Johnson Fortune (1994)
