= Sugar Chile Robinson, Billie Holiday, Count Basie and His Sextet =

1950 film

Promotional poster art for 'Sugar Chile' Robinson, Billie Holiday, Count Basie and His Sextet (1950).

"Sugar Chile" Robinson, Billie Holiday, Count Basie and His Sextet is a 1950 short film presenting five jazz numbers in a 15-minute running time. The film includes Billie Holiday performing "God Bless the Child" and "Now, Baby or Never", the Count Basie Sextet performing "One O'Clock Jump", and juvenile performer Frank "Sugar Chile" Robinson performing "Numbers Boogie" and "After School Boogie". The film was directed by Will Cowan and produced and released by Universal-International Pictures.
