= Lily Daw and the Three Ladies =

Short story by Eudora Welty

"Lily Daw and the Three Ladies" is a short story by Eudora Welty, first published in Prairie Schooner (Winter 1937). It is included in Welty's first collection of short stories A Curtain of Green (1941). Critics have found it possible for Welty to have been influenced by fairy tales, folklore and or nursery rhymes when writing this story, as there are elements of each within this piece. "Lily Daw and the Three Ladies" is speculated to fit anywhere in the classification system from grimly comedic to documentary realism or literary allegory.

== Plot ==
In Victory, Mississippi, Lily Daw is someone with acute special needs and a traumatic past. Lily is cared for by Mrs. Watts and Mrs. Carson, with family friend Aimee Slocum being involved in her life as well. Mrs. Watts, Mrs. Carson and Aimee receive a letter that Lily is eligible to go to Ellisville Institute for the Feeble-Minded of Mississippi. They go to find Lily to tell her the news, but find she is packing to go get married. The three ladies think she is speaking nonsense and try to not think the worst has happened to her as they try to get her to come with them to the institute. The ladies start bribing Lily with various items in order to get her to leave as she has her mind set on marrying a mysterious xylophone player. After some time, the ladies end up being successful in getting her to go to the institute. Mrs. Watts and Mrs. Carson board the train with Lily and are ready to see her off. After Aimee said her farewells and was off the train, she runs into said xylophone player Lily was talking about marrying. After short conversation and realizing it was him, Aimee was able to yell to Mrs. Watts and Mrs. Carson who then drug Lily off the train. When Lily was told she was going to get married, she was upset since she no longer wanted to get married and was looking forward to going to Ellisville. Mrs. Carson's husband is the baptist preacher, and she had arranged for him to officiate the wedding before Lily would be sent off with her xylophone-playing husband.

== Characters ==
- Lily Daw - Protagonist. She has acute special needs and has been through a lot growing up; is rather feeble-minded. She was taken in by her caretakers Mrs. Watts and Mrs. Carson.
- Mrs. Watts - Caretaker of Lily. Is worried about Lily as she is growing up and seemingly becomes more promiscuous. She is concerned about Lily's well-being and has intentions of sending her to an institution where she can be better cared for and watched.
- Mrs. Carson - Caretaker of Lily. Is equally concerned about Lily's body changing and her becoming more sexually active—makes mutual decision to send Lily away to the institution.
- Aimee Slocum - Friend of Mrs. Watts and Mrs. Carson. Aimee becomes involved in Lily's life through the two ladies, but doesn't necessarily care for her in the same way that Mrs. Watts and Mrs. Carson do. She tags along for the ride and tries to help enrich Lily's life and help the ladies when able.
- Xylophone player - Lily's partner and soon-to-be husband. Not much is known about him. He is part of a band that was playing in the city of Victory when he met Lily Daw and was smitten. They mutually agreed to get married and it ended up working out since the ladies realized that he was a real person and not Lily living in a fantasy.
