= Why I Live at the P.O. =

Short story by Eudora Welty

Penguin Books publication (1995)

"Why I Live at the P.O." is a short story by Eudora Welty. It was originally published in The Atlantic (April 1941), and was also published in her collection A Curtain of Green (1941). The work was inspired by a photograph taken by Welty that depicts a woman ironing at the back of a post office. The story is classified as an example of Southern realism. "Why I Live at the P.O." is one of Welty's most popular and frequently anthologized stories.

== Plot ==
On the Fourth of July in China Grove, Mississippi, Sister, the narrator, who is also a protagonist, begins her story when her younger sister, Stella-Rondo, comes back home after separating from her husband – Mr. Whitaker. Stella brings with her a child, Shirley-T. and despite a great resemblance to Papa-Daddy (grandfather of Sister and Stella-Rondo) she claims the girl is adopted. Sister does not believe her and that begins a series of quarrels between the siblings, whose relationship has been tough since Stella caused Sister's and Mr. Whitaker's breakup and married the man. Later that day, Stella lies to Papa-Daddy about Sister suggesting that he should shave his beard, to which he is very devoted. That causes a tension between him and his granddaughter. Then Uncle Rondo enters the house and borrows Stella's negligee, which makes her comment upon his look to Sister. A while later the sisters have another argument concerning Shirley-T. – Sister claims that the girl cannot speak, which angers Stella and also makes Mama upset. Mother even suggests that Sister should apologize to Stella, but she refuses and quarrels with Mama. As a result, Stella convinces Uncle Rondo that Sister suggested that he looks like a fool in her pink kimono. This lie aggravates the uncle; he believes that Sister really vilified him and that makes him mad at her. As everyone in the house is angry with Sister because of Stella-Rondo's lies, she leaves her home and moves to the post office, where she works.

== Characters ==
- Sister – narrator and protagonist; she is the U.S. postmistress in the very small town of China Grove, Mississippi, working in a tiny one-person post office. She is one year older than Stella-Rondo. She dated Mr. Whitaker before her sister. After Stella caused their breakup and married the man their relationship became tough, although she believes that Stella-Rondo was always spoiled.
- Stella-Rondo – narrator's younger sister and rival. After separating from her husband – Mr. Whitaker, she comes back home with a child, who (as she claims) is adopted. Stella tells lies to other family members; she wants to be the center of attention and expects them to give her emotional support.
- Papa-Daddy – Sister's grandfather. He is very proud of his connections, which helped him get his granddaughter appointed postmistress. He is very devoted to his beard, which symbolizes the old order.
- Mama – she is very supportive of her younger daughter, Stella-Rondo, and seems to favor her, although she believes that she treats the sisters equally.
- Uncle Rondo – he visits his family on July 4 and borrows Stella's kimono, which leads to a quarrel. He is temperamental and easily provoked.
- Shirley-T. – daughter of Stella, supposedly adopted. She is two years old.
- Mr. Whitaker - Stella-Rondo's husband, a photographer. He used to date Sister, but left her because of Stella's lie.
