= Joe Guy (musician) =

American jazz trumpeter (1920–1962)

- Born: Joseph Luke Guy; September 29, 1920
- Origin: New York City, U.S.
- Died: June 1, 1962 (aged 41)
- Genres: Jazz; bebop
- Occupation: Musician
- Instrument: Trumpet
- Years active: late 1930s – 1962
- Formerly of: Fats Waller band; Teddy Hill band; Coleman Hawkins band

Joseph Luke Guy (September 29, 1920 – June 1, 1962) was an American jazz trumpeter. He had a promising career as a young, progressive be-bop musician as he worked alongside more prominent musical acts until a drug addiction sidelined him from further success.

Much of Guy's early personal life is obscured, but it is known he began his professional music career performing in New York City and joined Fats Waller's backup band in the late 1930s. Following that, in 1938, Guy succeeded Dizzy Gillespie in Teddy Hill's orchestra and patterned a playing style that followed his musical role model, Roy Eldridge. Despite his range, speed, and potential, Guy never managed to surpass Eldridge's abilities, though Guy was considered a musical talent when taking into account his young age. Additionally, he became a key soloist in Coleman Hawkins's short-lived big band in 1940.

In 1941–42, Guy was a regular performer as a member of the after-hours band at Minton's Playhouse, alongside Nick Fenton, Kenny Clarke, and Thelonious Monk, in jam sessions with early bop music. Also during this period, Guy was actively involved in numerous recordings by Jerry Newman and also appeared on songs by Charlie Christian, Hot Lips Page, Roy Eldridge, and Don Byas. Guy began incorporating Gillespie's influences into his playing, with his performance on Monk's 1942 song "Epistrophy" arguably being the highlight of his recording career. Much of his appearances as an instrumentalist are marked by his enthusiasm and tempo; however, on occasion, Guy would over exert himself and consequently sound erratic.

Guy struggled with a heroin addiction throughout the majority of his brief career. In 1945–46, he was involved with Billie Holiday both professionally and intimately. When Guy and Holiday were both busted for drug possession, the two cut ties thereafter. Afterwards, Guy moved to his birthplace in Birmingham, Alabama, before falling into relative obscurity among the music industry. Still, he performed at the Woodland Club with local musician Frank Adams and advised others about the dangers of his addiction.

Guy died on June 1, 1962, at the age of 41.
