= Sugar Chile Robinson =

Pianist and singer (born 1938)

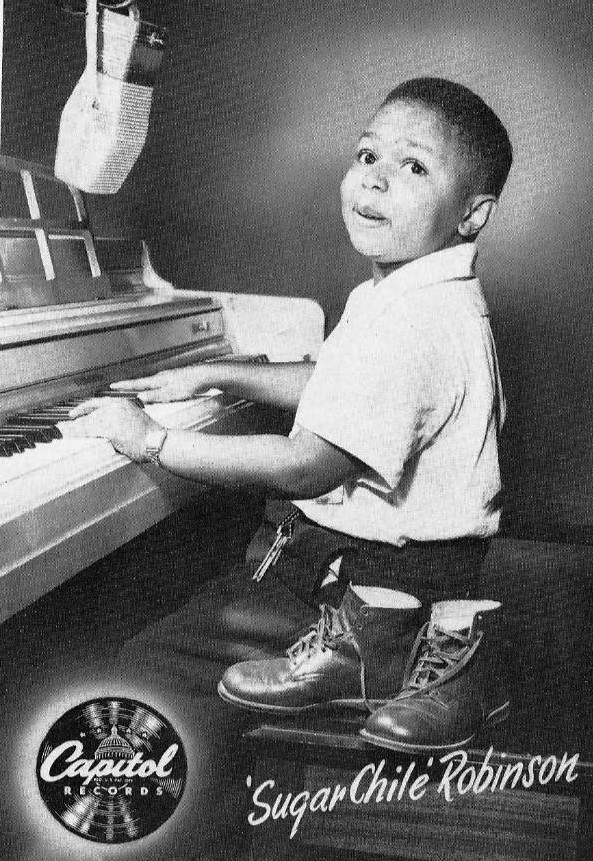
- Robinson, c. 1950

Background information
- Also known as: Sugar; Sugar Chile Robinson
- Born: Frank Isaac Robinson; December 28, 1938 (age 87); Detroit, Michigan, US
- Genres: Blues; boogie-woogie
- Occupation: Musician
- Instruments: Piano; Vocals
- Years active: 1945–1959; 2002–2014
- Label: Capitol

Frank Isaac Robinson (born December 28, 1938), known in his early musical career as Sugar Chile Robinson, is an American jazz pianist and singer. A Detroit native, Robinson became famous as a child prodigy in the mid-1940s.

== Early life, family and education ==
Robinson was born in Detroit, Michigan, the youngest of seven children of Clarence A. and Elizabeth Robinson. His father was a truck driver, but eventually the family owned a neighborhood store. At an early age, Frank showed unusual gifts, reciting the alphabet at 6 months old, reading at age three, and singing the blues and accompanying himself on the piano before he was two years old. According to contemporary newsreels, he was self-taught and managed to use techniques including slapping the keys with elbows and fists. Robinson won a talent show at the Paradise Theatre in Detroit at age three.

He was a small person, weighing only 40 lb (18 kg) at age 7. Even as an adult, he was under 5 ft (1.5 m) tall. Because of his youth and stature, he often played piano while standing.

His mother died when he was about five years old.

After retiring from his childhood musical career in 1959, Robinson earned a degree in history from Olivet College and one in psychology from the Detroit Institute of Technology.

== Career ==
In 1945, he played guest spots at the theatre with Lionel Hampton, who was prevented by child protection legislation from taking Robinson on tour with him. However, Robinson performed on radio with Hampton and Harry "The Hipster" Gibson, and he also appeared as himself in the Hollywood film No Leave, No Love, starring Van Johnson and Keenan Wynn.

In 1946, Robinson played for President Harry S. Truman at the White House Correspondents' Association Dinner, shouting out "How'm I Doin', Mr. President?" – which became his catchphrase – during his performance of "Caldonia". He was the first African American performer to appear at the annual WHCA dinner.

He began touring major theaters, setting box office records in Detroit and California. At his peak, he was earning $10,000 a week. In 1949, he was given special permission to join the American Federation of Musicians and record his first releases on Capitol Records, "Numbers Boogie" and "Caldonia", both reaching the Billboard R&B chart. In 1950, he toured and appeared on television with Count Basie and in a short film 'Sugar Chile' Robinson, Billie Holiday, Count Basie and His Sextet. The following year, he toured the UK, appearing at the London Palladium.

He stopped recording in 1952. Until 1956, Robinson continued to make occasional appearances as a jazz musician, billed as Frank Robinson, and performed on one occasion with Gerry Mulligan, but then ended his musical career by 1959, later explaining:

I wanted to go to school ... I wanted some school background in me and I asked my Dad if I could stop, and I went to school because I honestly wanted my college diploma.

=== Hiatus from being a musician ===
In the 1960s, he worked for WGPR-TV. He also helped set up small record labels in Detroit and opened a recording studio. He also worked at his parents' store.

=== Return as musician ===
In more recent years, Robinson has made occasional appearances as a musician with the help of the American Music Research Foundation. In 2002, he appeared at a special concert celebrating the music of Detroit, and in 2007 he traveled to Britain to appear at a rock and roll weekend festival.

In the last Dr Boogie show of 2013, Robinson was the featured artist, with four of his classic hits showcased amid biographical sketches of his early career.

== Recognition and honors ==
On April 30, 2016, Robinson attended the White House Correspondents' Dinner on the 70th anniversary of his appearance at the 1946 dinner. Robinson met President Barack Obama and was saluted during the dinner, receiving a standing ovation as the picture of him as a child appeared on the video screens.

In 2016, Robinson was inducted into the Rhythm & Blues Music Hall of Fame.

Robinson's 1955 song "Go Boy Go" was featured in a GMC advertisement in 2020.

== Personal life ==
In 2013, Robinson lost his belongings in a house fire which led him into financial trouble. The Music Maker Relief Foundation received a call from friends and sent him a bed and put him on a monthly sustenance program. Buddy Smith, who was inspired by Robinson in the 1940s, sent him a piano.
