= Linda Lipnack Kuehl =

American arts journalist (1940–1978)

- Born: Linda Lipnack; January 24, 1940; New York, U.S.
- Died: February 6, 1978 (aged 38); Washington, D.C., U.S.
- Occupation: Arts journalist
- Known for: Research on the life of Billie Holiday

Linda Lipnack Kuehl (January 24, 1940 – February 6, 1978) was an American arts journalist, based in New York City. Intending to write a biography of Billie Holiday, she interviewed friends, fellow performers, and key figures in Holiday's life, but died before its completion. Various other writers' biographies on Holiday have drawn upon Kuehl's material, as did the film Billie (2019), which is narrated by Kuehl's recorded interviews. She worked as a high school teacher and free lance writer.

== Arts journalism career ==
Interviews that Kuehl conducted with writers were published in The Paris Review in 1972 and 1978.

She was a Jewish feminist and a fan of Billie Holiday. In 1971, she began plans for a biography of Holiday, who had died aged 44 in 1959. She interviewed almost 200 people—friends, family members, band members, peers from 1930s Harlem, piano players, psychiatrists and a pimp—and was still finding people in 1978. Her archive on Holiday included these interviews on 125 audio tapes as well as "a long paper trail, including police files, transcripts of court cases, royalty statements, shopping lists, hospital records, private letters, muddled transcripts and fragments of unfinished chapters." However, Kuehl did not complete the book. In 1978 she was found dead on a Washington, D.C. sidewalk, after attending a Count Basie concert. "Police deemed it suicide, Kuehl having supposedly jumped from her hotel room, although there was no proof of this", and her family believes she may have been murdered.

Kuehl's research revealed that Holiday's addictions were "becoming a crutch for a life beset with violence, misogyny and racism."

== Legacy ==
Her archive passed to a private collector and was later used in other writers' biographies of Holiday. The interviews were a major source for the text in Robert O'Meally's book of photographs Lady Day: The Many Faces of Billie Holiday (1991) and around the same were used for the script for a Masters of American Music series documentary of the same name. Some of Kuehl's material was used in Donald Clarke's 1994 biography, Wishing on the Moon and her interviews were used in Julia Blackburn's 2005 biography With Billie: a New Look at the Unforgettable Lady Day. Documentary director James Erskine bought the rights to Kuehl's tapes and his subsequent film, Billie (2019), is "a journey through Holiday's life, narrated by the voices on those tapes", including Kuehl's.

== Personal life ==
Kuehl's parents were Sol and Ida Lipnack and she had a sister, Myra Luftman.
