= Clarence Holiday =

American jazz musician (1898–1937)

Clarence Halliday (Baltimore, July 23, 1898 – Dallas, March 1, 1937), also known as Clarence Holiday, was an American musician. He was the father of the singer Billie Holiday.

== Early life ==
In Baltimore he attended a boys' school with the banjo player Elmer Snowden. Both of them played banjo with various Baltimore jazz bands, including the band of Eubie Blake. At the age of 16, Holiday became the unmarried father of Billie Holiday, who was born to 19-year-old Sarah Fagan (later Sadie Harris). He rarely visited Harris or her daughter. He moved from Baltimore to Philadelphia when he was 21 years old.

== Career ==
Holiday played rhythm guitar and banjo as a member of the Fletcher Henderson Orchestra (1928–33). He also recorded with Benny Carter (1934) and Bob Howard (1935) and worked with Charlie Turner (1935), Louis Metcalf (1935–36), and the Don Redman Big Band (1936–37).

== Death ==
Holiday died in 1937. He was exposed to mustard gas while serving in World War I. Later, he fell ill with a lung disorder while on tour in Texas and was refused treatment at a local hospital. He was treated in the colored ward of the Veterans Hospital, and by then pneumonia had set in and without antibiotics, the illness was fatal.
